= Bascombe Well Conservation Park =

Protected area in South Australia

- IUCN category VI (protected area with sustainable use of natural resources)
- Location within South Australia
- Location: South Australia
- Nearest city: Lock
- Coordinates: 33.67°S 135.48°E
- Area: 334.30 km^{2} (129.07 sq mi)
- Established: 2 July 1970
- Visitors: 'low' (in 2007)
- Governing body: Department for Environment and Water

Bascombe Well Conservation Park, formerly known as Bascombe Well National Park, is a protected area in the Australian state of South Australia located on Eyre Peninsula in the gazetted localities of Kappawanta and Murdinga about 115 kilometres (71 mi) north of Port Lincoln and about 25 kilometres (16 mi) south-west of Lock.

The conservation park occupies land in the cadastral units of the Hundreds of Barwell, Blesing, Cowan and Kappawanta located to the immediate west of the Tod Highway and to the immediate south of the Birdseye Highway.

Land within the extent of the conservation park as of 2017 first obtained protected area status as the Bascombe Well National Park on 2 July 1970 under the National Parks and Wildlife Reserves Act 1891-1960 In 1972, it was constituted as a conservation park upon the proclamation of the National Parks and Wildlife Act 1972 on 27 April 1972. Additions of land to the conservation park in the Hundred of Cowan during 1979 and in both the Hundreds of Blesing and Cowan during 1980. Crown land located in the hundreds of Blesing and Cowan which had been previously dedicated as a conservation reserve known as the Bascombe Well Conservation Reserve under the Crown Lands Act 1929 in 1993 was added to the conservation park on 22 March 2007. The name is derived from Bascombe Well, a feature located within its boundaries.

The land previously part of the Bascombe Well Conservation Reserve is subject to access under the Mining Act 1971.

The land on which the conservation park is located was used for at least a century for pastoral purposes firstly by Price Maurice following by others until 1967 when the lease was resumed by the Government of South Australia. The previous use is evident by the remains of buildings and stone fences throughout the conservation park.

As of 2007, the conservation park was reported to support the following species of flora:

1. Tree communities observed included "mallee communities" dominated by coastal white mallee and mallee box along with "occasional red gum woodlands", which are believed to be supported by "small groundwater lenses", which are present at a shallow depth.
2. 14 plant species of conservation significance have been recorded included west coast mintbush, limestone leek-orchid and Thysanotus nudicaulis.
3. Introduced weed species such as bridal creeper, boxthorn and horehound.

As of 2007, the conservation park was reported to support the following species of fauna:

1. Twelve species of mammal have been recorded of which seven of which are indigenous "including three species of bat". The discovery of the grey-bellied dunnart both in the conservation park and the Hincks Wilderness Protection Area during December 2004 represented "a significant range extension from Western Australia" where the species had previously been observed. Introduced species observed include the European rabbit, the red fox, the feral cat and the house mouse.
2. 85 species of bird have been recorded of which 84 are indigenous including the following species of conservation significance at both state and national level - blue-breasted fairywren, chestnut quail-thrush, malleefowl, painted buttonquail and shining bronze cuckoo. The sole recorded introduced species is the common starling.
3. Twenty-two species of reptile and one species of amphibian were recorded including the following species of conservation significance at state level - the jacky lizard and the dwarf four-toed slider. The sole species of amphibian is the trilling frog.

As of 2007, visitor numbers were reported as being "low" and that the "main recreational pursuit" was "picnicking, which is undertaken at the ruins". Also, access to and travel within the conservation park was via tracks suitable only for four-wheel drive vehicles and that no visitor facilities had been provided on the assumption that visitors will be "self-reliant".

The conservation park is classified as an IUCN Category VI protected area. In 1980, it was listed on the now-defunct Register of the National Estate.

== See also ==
- Protected areas of South Australia
