= Peachna Conservation Park =

Protected area in South Australia

- IUCN category VI (protected area with sustainable use of natural resources)
- Location within South Australia
- Location: South Australia
- Nearest city: Tooligie.
- Coordinates: 33°50′08″S 135°38′15″E
- Area: 45.85 km^{2} (17.70 sq mi)
- Established: 11 November 1993
- Governing body: Department for Environment and Water

Peachna Conservation Park (formerly the Peachna Conservation Reserve) is a protected area in the Australian state of South Australia located on Eyre Peninsula in the gazetted locality of Tooligie about 100 kilometres (62 mi) north of Port Lincoln and about 30 kilometres (19 mi) south of Lock.

The conservation park occupies land in the cadastral unit of the Hundred of Peachna located to the immediate west of the Tod Highway and which is bounded in part to the south by Nowhere Else Road which runs from the town centre in Tooligie in the east to Sheringa in the west.

It was dedicated as a conservation reserve on 11 November 1993 under Crown Lands Act 1929 in respect to the following land in the cadastral unit of the Hundred of Peachna – allotment 2 of Deposited Plan No. 30843 and section 36. On 22 March 2007, the protected land was proclaimed as the Peachna Conservation Park under the National Parks and Wildlife Act 1972. It was dedicated to “conserve remnant vegetation” with access under the Mining Act 1971 being permitted.

Its name is derived from the Hundred of Peachna. The name of the original protected area was proposed to be the Tooligie Conservation Park but this was not approved by Geographical Names Board with the name Peachna Conservation Park being approved on 2 April 1990. However, the conservation park was never proclaimed and the land proposed for protection was ultimately proclaimed as the Peachna Conservation Reserve in 1993.

As of 2007, the Peachna Conservation Park was reported as being “dominated by mallee” including the following communities – “Eucalyptus diversifolia (coastal white mallee) open mallee community and the Eucalyptus porosa (mallee box) mallee community”.

As of 2007, there was no access for visitors into the interior of the conservation park and nor was there plans to create such access.

The conservation park is classified as an IUCN Category VI protected area.

== See also ==
- Protected areas of South Australia
