= Colton, South Australia =

Colton
- Suburb
- Coordinates: 33.4816°S 134.9236°E
- Country: Australia
- State: South Australia
- Region: Eyre Western
- LGA: District Council of Elliston
- Location: 374 km (232 mi) north-west of Adelaide; 19 km (12 mi) north of Elliston
- Established: 1999

Government
  - State electorate: Flinders
  - Federal division: Grey

Population
  - Total: 24 (SAL 2021)
- Time zone: UTC+9:30 (ACST)
  - Summer (DST): UTC+10:30 (ACST)
- Postcode: 5670
- County: Musgrave
- Mean max temp: 21.4 °C (70.5 °F)
- Mean min temp: 11.8 °C (53.2 °F)
- Annual rainfall: 426.3 mm (16.78 in)
Suburbs around Colton
Ocean	Talia	Mount Wedge
Ocean	Colton	Mount Wedge; Mount Joy
Ocean	Elliston	Mount Joy
- Location; Coordinates; Climate; Adjoining localities

Colton is a locality in the Australian state of South Australia located on the west coast of Eyre Peninsula overlooking the Great Australian Bight about 374 kilometres (232 mi) north-west of the state capital of Adelaide and about 19 kilometres (12 mi) north of the municipal seat of Elliston.

Boundaries created in November 1999 for “the long established name” which is ultimately derived from Sir John Colton, a former Premier of South Australia.

Initial development within what is the current locality involved the following:

On 21 December 1880 Daniel Thomas Kenny (1849-1934)... entered into an agreement with the Department of Lands to purchase sections 43W and 59, Hundred of Colton, comprising 97 and 274 acres respectively - this land adjoined the junction of five roads and as such was a prime sight for a hotel to cater for travellers in an area which was gradually being opened up for closer settlement. His brother, Michael S.W. Kenny, took over the land on 12 April 1887 and completed the purchase of same in 1902. During this period he was active in alienating portion of it, which the Register of 25 May 1901 described as a `private township'- his contribution was providing land for a showground in 1894, a hall in 1903 and, with the cooperation of his brother, the erection of a hotel which opened for business in 1884; at other times he was described as a "banker", postmaster and poundkeeper. Adjacent to the Kenny land, the government reserved for a school a small portion of section 57 - it opened in 1885 and closed in 1956...

Colton overlooks a portion of the southern coastline of Anxious Bay, a subsidiary bay to the Great Australian Bight. The Flinders Highway runs in a north–south direction through the locality. The principal land uses within the locality are ‘primary production’ and conservation with the latter being associated with the coastline and the Lake Newland Conservation Park. Land on the eastern side of the locality is part of a ‘water protection zone’ which is a statutory measure to control development over an area of land associated with groundwater recharge.

Colton is located within the federal Division of Grey, the state electoral district of Flinders, the local government area of the District Council of Elliston and the state's Eyre and Western region.
