= Kappawanta =

- Town
- Coordinates: 33.66474°S 135.28009°E
- Country: Australia
- State: South Australia
- LGA: District Council of Elliston
- Location: 36 km (22 mi) east of Elliston; 70 km (43 mi) south of Wudinna
- Established: Before 1862

Government
  - State electorate: Flinders
  - Federal division: Grey

Population
  - Total: 0 (SAL 2021)
- Postcode: 5670
Localities around Kappawanta
Mount Joy	Coolillie	Polda
Bramfield	Kappawanta	Lock, Murdinga
	Sheringa	Tooligie

Kappawanta (also known as Kappawanta Station) is both a pastoral lease that operates as a sheep station and a gazetted bounded locality in South Australia.

It is situated approximately 36 kilometres (22 mi) east of Elliston and 70 kilometres (43 mi) south of Wudinna on the Eyre Peninsula near Lake Newland. The eastern part of Kappawanta includes most of the Bascombe Well Conservation Park.

In 1862 Kappawanta was owned by Thomas Horn and Edward Kent when they dissolved their partnership. In 1863 the station was stocked with 5,345 sheep.

In 1888 the 102-square-mile (264 km^{2}) property that had an estimated £3,182 worth of improvements was placed on the market for auction. The following year all the station stock and plant was sold off and the property was effectively abandoned.

Messrs R Myers and Son, who had acquired the property some time prior to 1893, placed the property up for auction in 1896. At this time Kappawanta occupied an area of 102 square miles (260 km^{2}) and was stocked with 6,200 sheep, 15 cattle and 5 horses and had been divided into 18 paddocks. By 1898 the property was owned by Edward Morris, who acquired it after winning the lottery. Morris remained on the property routinely producing between 90 and 160 bales of wool each year until he died after a brief illness at age 56 in 1908.

Elizabeth Morris continued to run the property, with her sons eventually taking over management. In 1932 large areas of Kappawanta and neighbouring properties Hillside and Portanna, were all swept by bushfires that started from lightning strikes. Severe storms hit the area in 1942, with the homestead being unroofed and many windmills being blown over.

George and Edward Morris owned the station until 1948, when they sold it to R. Sheehan.

The boundaries of the locality of Kappawanta were formalised in November 1999 for the long established local name. It includes the cadastral hundreds of Kappawanta, Blesing and Hudd, and sections of the hundreds of Barwell, Cowan and Tinline.

== See also ==
- List of ranches and stations
