= Lincoln Highway, South Australia =

Highway in South Australia

Lincoln Highway South Australia
- Coordinates: 32.618899°S 137.569620°E (Northeast end); 34.717987°S 135.853880°E (Southwest end)

General information
- Type: Highway
- Length: 315 km (196 mi)
- Route number(s): B100 (1999–present)
- Former route number: Alt National Route 1 (1978–1999)

Major junctions
- Northeast end: Eyre Highway; Lincoln Gap, South Australia
- Birdseye Highway
- Southwest end: Flinders Highway; Port Lincoln, South Australia

Location(s)
- Region: Eyre Western
- Major settlements: Whyalla, Cowell, Port Neill, Arno Bay, Tumby Bay, Louth Bay, North Shields

Highway system
- Highways in Australia; National Highway • Freeways in Australia; Highways in South Australia

Lincoln Highway is a highway in South Australia which links the cities of Port Augusta and Port Lincoln located on the east coast of Eyre Peninsula over a distance of 315 kilometres (196 miles). Lincoln Highway – along with Flinders Highway – presents an alternative but somewhat longer coastal route between Ceduna and Port Augusta, compared to the more direct route along Eyre Highway. It is designated route B100.

== Route ==
After leaving Port Augusta, the highway passes through hot and arid saltbush-covered and scrub terrain. It soon passes through the largest and most significant town along the route, which is the steel city of Whyalla. Continuing southwest it connects with such coastal towns as Cowell, Port Neill and Arno Bay which have good fishing spots. The terrain here is interspersed with broad-acre grain cropping in suitable localities, and the scenery gets greener the more it heads southwest towards Port Lincoln.

Sealed with bitumen, it has many straight stretches with few steep inclines or declines, and for the most part has a 110 km/h speed limit. It has one lane in each direction, with few overtaking lanes. The highway runs along the eastern coast of the Eyre Peninsula but just so far inland as to allow only glimpses of the Gulf in certain places.

Port Lincoln itself is a prosperous fishing port and an important grain terminal serving the Eyre Peninsula wheatbelt.

== History ==
The first Europeans to traverse most of this route, in April 1840, were Governor Gawler and John Hill, who explored on horseback from Port Lincoln to the Middleback Range near the location of the site of Whyalla.

The South Australian government decreed "the road from Port Augusta to Port Lincoln will be known as the Lincoln Highway", taking effect on 1 July 1938.

== Major junctions ==
LGA	Location	km	mi	Destinations	Notes
Pastoral Unincorporated Area	Lincoln Gap	0	0.0	Eyre Highway – Port Augusta, Kimba	Northeastern terminus of highway and route B100
Whyalla	Whyalla	47	29	Iron Knob Road – Iron Knob	
Whyalla	Middleback Range	72	45	Middleback Road – Iron Baron	
Franklin Harbour	Cowell	161	100	Birdseye Highway (B91) – Cleve, Lock	
Cleve	Arno Bay	198	123	Arno Bay Road – Cleve, Kimba	
Tumby Bay	Tumby Bay	269	167	Bratten Way – Cummins	
Port Lincoln	Port Lincoln	315	196	Flinders Highway (B100) – Elliston, Ceduna	Southwestern terminus of Lincoln Highway, route B100 continues south
Route transition

== See also ==
- Highways in Australia
- List of highways in South Australia
- Flinders Highway, South Australia
