= Hambidge =

Hambidge is a surname. Notable people with the surname include:

- Alice Hambidge (1869–1947), Australian artist
- Clive M. Hambidge (1888–1950), Surveyor General of South Australia from 1937 to 1950
- Douglas Hambidge (born 1927), Canadian Anglican bishop
- Jack Hambidge (1907–1994), British sprinter and Olympian
- Jay Hambidge (1867–1924), Canadian-born American artist
- Joan Hambidge (born 1956), South African poet, literary theorist and academic

== See also ==
- Hambidge (disambiguation)
- Hanbidge
