= Murdinga, South Australia =

Murdinga South Australia
- Coordinates: 33.7223°S 135.7087°E
- Population: 72 (SAL 2021)
- Established: 1936
- Postcode(s): 5607
- Location: 297 km (185 mi) w of Adelaide; 100 km (62 mi) N of Port Lincoln
- LGA(s): District Council of Elliston
- Region: Eyre and Western
- County: Jervois; Musgrave
- State electorate(s): Flinders
- Federal division(s): Grey
Mean max temp	Mean min temp	Annual rainfall
25.2 °C; 77 °F	9.3 °C; 49 °F	312.9 mm 12.3 in
Localities around Murdinga:
Kappawanta	Lock	Murlong
Kappawanta; Tooligie	Murdinga	Murlong
Tooligie	Tooligie	Hincks
- Footnotes: Locations; Climate; Adjoining localities

Murdinga is a locality in South Australia located on the Eyre Peninsula about 297 kilometres (185 mi) west of the state capital of Adelaide. The name reportedly stems from an Aboriginal word for "cold".

It includes a railway siding with bulk grain facilities on the Eyre Peninsula Railway and is adjacent to the Tod Highway south of Lock.

Murdinga began as a government town surveyed in January 1936 and proclaimed by Governor Dugan on 19 March 1936. The boundaries of the locality were “created in November 1999 for the long established name” and include the government town of Murdinga.

The Murdinga Hall was opened in 1953. The Murdinga Country Fire Service station opened in 1955. Murdinga School opened in 1938 and closed in 1961. The United (Murdinga) Football Club operated in the Central Areas Football Association from 1946 until the league's disbandment in 1957, before merging with Karkoo to form the United Football Club in the Great Flinders Football League. It also formerly had a cricket club in the Middle Areas Cricket Association.

The principal land use within the locality is ‘primary production’ which is mainly concerned with grain and wool production. It also includes part of the protected area known as the Bascombe Well Conservation Park. Murdinga includes the Wilgerup station which is the site of a proposed iron ore mine to be operated by Centrex Metals.

Murdinga is located within the federal division of Grey, the state electoral district of Flinders and the local government area of the District Council of Elliston.

== See also ==
- List of cities and towns in South Australia
