= Hambidge (disambiguation) =

Hambidge is a surname.

Hambidge may also refer to.

== Australia ==
- Hambidge, South Australia, a locality
- Hambidge Wilderness Protection Area, a protected area in South Australia which was preceded by the Hambidge Conservation Park and then by the Hambidge National Park
- Hundred of Hambidge, a cadastral unit in South Australia

== United States ==
- Hambidge Center Historic District, a historic district in Georgia
