= County of Musgrave =

Musgrave
- Cadastral division
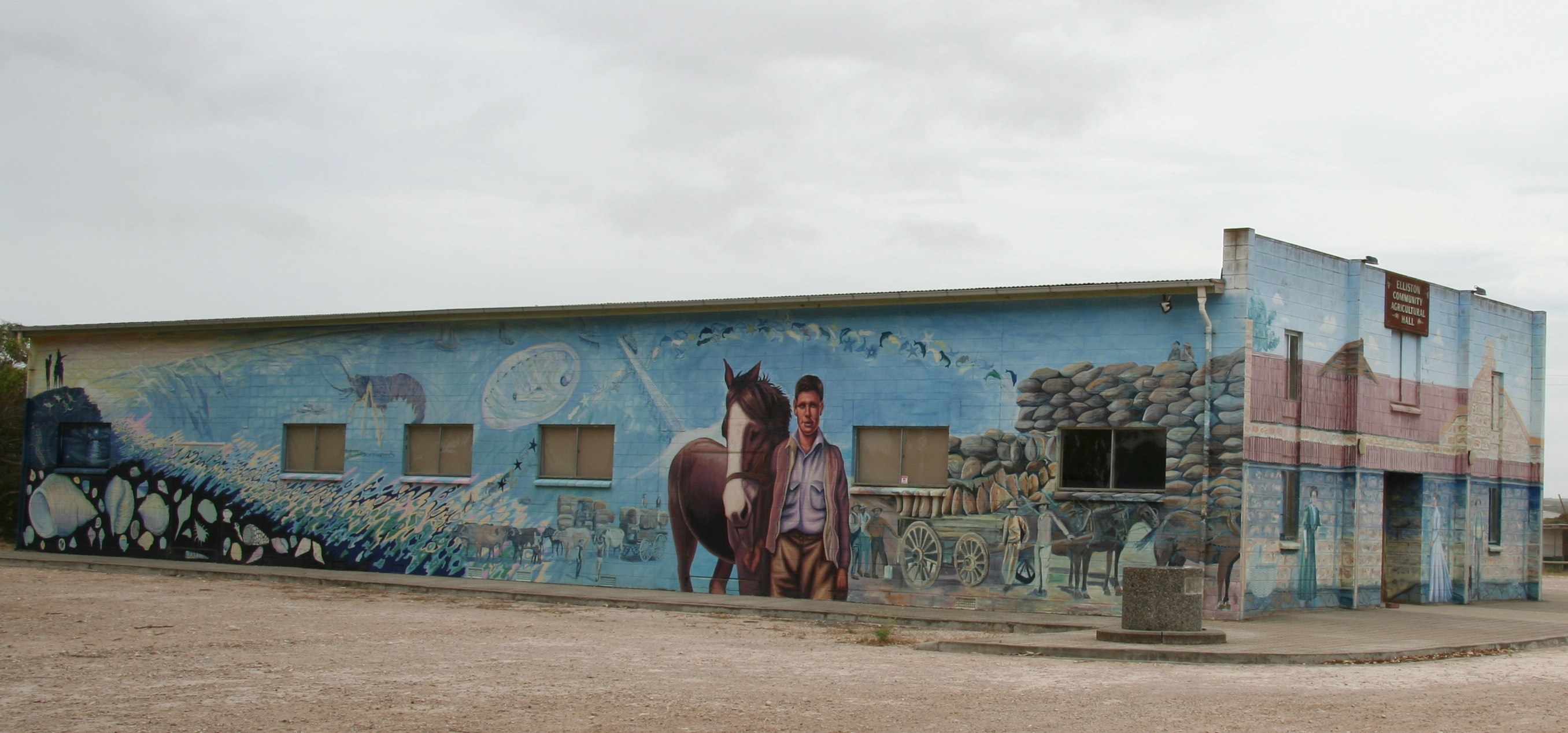
- Elliston Hall

- Coordinates: 33.736°S 135.416°E
- Country: Australia
- State: South Australia
- Region: Eyre Western
- LGA: District Council of Elliston District Council of Lower Eyre Peninsula
- Established: 1876

Area
  - Total: 6,300 km^{2} (2,450 sq mi)
Lands administrative divisions around Musgrave
Ocean	Robinson; Le Hunte	Le Hunte
Ocean	Musgrave	Jervois
Ocean	Flinders	Flinders
- Coordinates; Adjoining counties

The County of Musgrave is a cadastral unit in the Australian state of South Australia that covers land on the west coast of Eyre Peninsula. It was proclaimed on 22 June 1876 and named after Anthony Musgrave, the Governor of South Australia from 9 June 1876 to 29 January 1877.

== Description ==
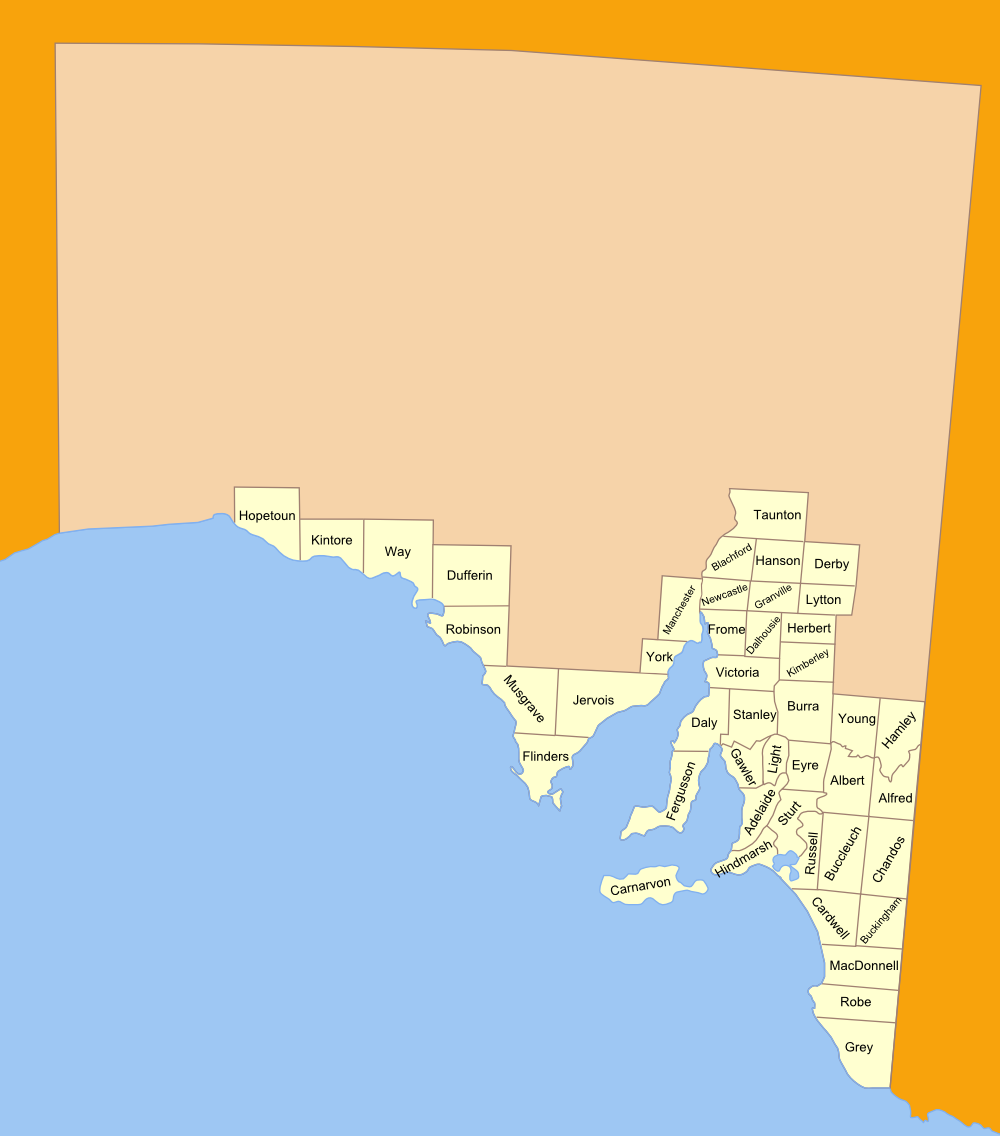
South Australian counties as of 1893 including Musgrave

The county covers the part of the west coast of the Eyre Peninsula overlooking the Great Australian Bight between Talia Beach in Anxious Bay in the north and Cape Drummond in the south, and extends inland from the coastline for a distance of about 90 kilometres (56 mi).

The town of Elliston falls within the county's borders, and the towns of Lock, Tooligie and Yeelanna are located adjacent to the county's eastern boundary.

The Flinders Highway passes along the coastline of the county from the northwest to the southeast, the Tod Highway passes through the county in a north–south alignment near its eastern boundary, and the Birdseye Highway passes through the county in a west–east direction between Elliston and Lock.

The Port Lincoln to Wudinna line of the Eyre Peninsula Railway passes through the county near its eastern boundary in a north–south alignment with a branch line terminating at Kapinne in the county's south, and with stations at Lock and Yeelanna.

== Constituent hundreds ==
The county comprises 20 hundreds. The hundreds are laid out from west to east in four rows (from north to south) as follows:

- Colton, Talia, Tinline, Squire, McIntosh and Ulyerra.
- Ward, Hudd, Kappawanta, Blesing and a cluster consisting of Barwell, McLachan and Cowan.
- Way, Pearce, Haig and Peachna.
- Kiana, Mitchell and Shannon.

=== Hundred of Barwell ===
The Hundred of Barwell (33°33′52″S 135°34′08″E) was proclaimed on 4 December 1919. It covers an area of 250 square kilometres (95 mi^{2}) and is named after Sir Henry Barwell, a former member of the South Australian Parliament.

=== Hundred of Blesing ===
The Hundred of Blesing (33°39′53″S 135°26′09″E) was proclaimed on 30 January 1936. It covers an area of 250 square kilometres (95 mi^{2}) and is named after A P Blesing, a former member of the South Australian Parliament.

=== Hundred of Colton ===
The Hundred of Colton, proclaimed on 22 June 1876, covers an area of 370 square kilometres (141 mi^{2}) and is named after John Colton, a former member of the South Australian Parliament.

=== Hundred of Cowan ===
The Hundred of Cowan (33°42′24″S 135°38′17″E) was proclaimed on 4 July 1929. It covers an area of 250 square kilometres (95 mi^{2}) and is named after John Cowan, a former member of the South Australian Parliament.

=== Hundred of Haig ===
The Hundred of Haig (33°51′38″S 135°32′31″E) was proclaimed on 9 July 1885 as the Hundred of Homburg (German: [ˈhɔmˌbʊʁk]) which was named after Robert Homburg, a member of the South Australian Parliament. In 1916, the hundred was renamed as part of the policy to change "names of enemy origin". The name Poondulta was proposed but did not proceed. The hundred was finally renamed as the Hundred of Haig after the British soldier, Douglas Haig, 1st Earl Haig. As the Hundred of Homburg, it covered an area of 400 square kilometres (156 mi^{2}) while as the Hundred of Haig, it covers an area of 280 square kilometres (108 mi^{2}).

=== Hundred of Hudd ===
The Hundred of Hudd (33°40′09″S 135°09′26″E) was proclaimed on 31 January 1936. It covers an area of 240 square kilometres (94 mi^{2}) and is named after Sir Herbert Sydney Hudd, a former member of the South Australian Parliament.

=== Hundred of Kappawanta ===
The Hundred of Kappawanta (33°40′01″S 135°17′40″E) was proclaimed on 31 January 1936. It covers an area of 240 square kilometres (94 mi^{2}) and is named after the Kappawanta Homestead.

=== Hundred of Kiana ===
The Hundred of Kiana (34°02′38″S 135°21′24″E) was proclaimed on 18 September 1879. It covers an area of 164 square kilometres (63.5 mi^{2}) and its name is reportedly derived from an Aboriginal name.

=== Hundred of McIntosh ===
The Hundred of McIntosh (33°24′35″S 135°33′14″E) was proclaimed on 20/ December 1934. It covers an area of 164 square kilometres (63.5 mi^{2}) and is named after Sir Malcolm McIntosh, a former member of the South Australian Parliament.

=== Hundred of McLachan ===
The Hundred of McLachan (33°34′48″S 135°42′07″E) was proclaimed on 25 April 1895. It covers an area of 350 square kilometres (136 mi^{2}) and is named after J McLachlan, a former member of the South Australian Parliament.

=== Hundred of Mitchell ===
The Hundred of Mitchell (34°03′00″S 135°31′14″E) was proclaimed on 26 November 1903. It covers an area of 400 square kilometres (156 mi^{2}) and is named after Samuel James Mitchell, a member of the South Australian Parliament at the time.

=== Hundred of Peachna ===
The Hundred of Peachna (33°50′10″S 135°41′03″E) was proclaimed on 3 August 1916. It covers an area of 350 square kilometres (136 mi^{2}) and its name is reportedly derived from an Aboriginal name.

=== Hundred of Pearce ===
The Hundred of Pearce (33°50′35″S 135°23′09″E) was proclaimed on 4 December 1884. It covers an area of 400 square kilometres (156 mi^{2}) and is named after James Pearce, a former member of the South Australian Parliament.

=== Hundred of Shannon ===
The Hundred of Shannon (34°03′16″S 135°41′21″E) was proclaimed on 15 January 1903. It covers an area of 400 square kilometres (156 mi^{2}) and is named after John Shannon, a former member of the South Australian Parliament.

=== Hundred of Squire ===
The Hundred of Squire (33°27′40″S 135°25′04″E) was proclaimed on 8 March 1894. It covers an area of 450 square kilometres (173 mi^{2}) and was named “in memory of the late Mr. Edward Squire, Deputy Postmaster-General.”

=== Hundred of Talia ===
The Hundred of Talia (33°27′24″S 135°03′58″E) was proclaimed on 22 September 1881. It covers an area of 450 square kilometres (173 mi^{2}) and its name is reportedly derived from an Aboriginal word meaning “near water.”

=== Hundred of Tinline ===
The Hundred of Tinline (33°27′39″S 135°14′31″E) was proclaimed on 22 September 1881. It covers an area of 440 square kilometres (169 mi^{2}) and is named after George Tinline, a former member of the South Australian Parliament.

=== Hundred of Ulyerra ===
The Hundred of Ulyerra (33°24′39″S 135°41′32″E) was proclaimed on 24 September 1925. It covers an area of 277.8 square kilometres (107.25 mi^{2}) and its name is reportedly derived from an Aboriginal word meaning “good.”

=== Hundred of Ward ===
The Hundred of Ward (33°39′03″S 135°00′19″E) was proclaimed on 22 June 1876. It covers an area of 300 square kilometres (114 mi^{2}) and is named after Ebenezer Ward, a former member of the South Australian Parliament.

=== Hundred of Way ===
The Hundred of Way (33°50′39″S 135°14′34″E) was proclaimed on 22 June 1876. It covers an area of 360 square kilometres (139 mi^{2}) and is named after Sir Samuel James Way, a former Chief Justice of the Supreme Court of South Australia.

== See also ==
- Lands administrative divisions of South Australia
- List of Australian place names changed from German names
