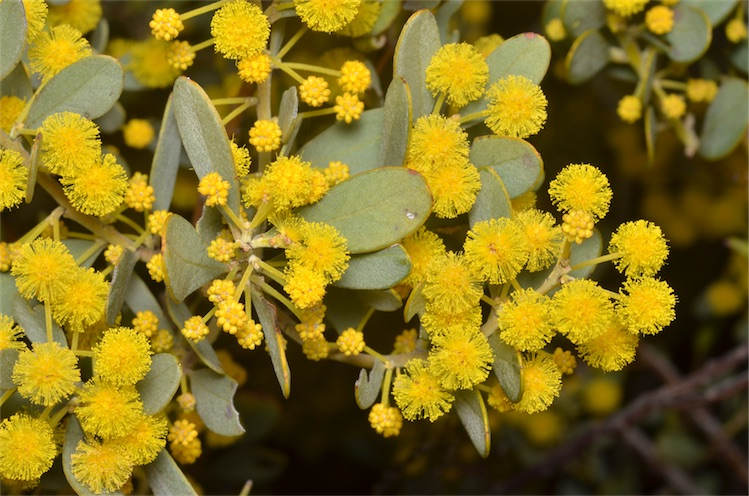

Scientific classification
- Kingdom: Plantae
- Clade: Tracheophytes
- Clade: Angiosperms
- Clade: Eudicots
- Clade: Rosids
- Order: Fabales
- Family: Fabaceae
- Subfamily: Caesalpinioideae
- Clade: Mimosoid clade
- Genus: Acacia
- Species: A. dictyocarpa

Binomial name
- Acacia dictyocarpa Benth.
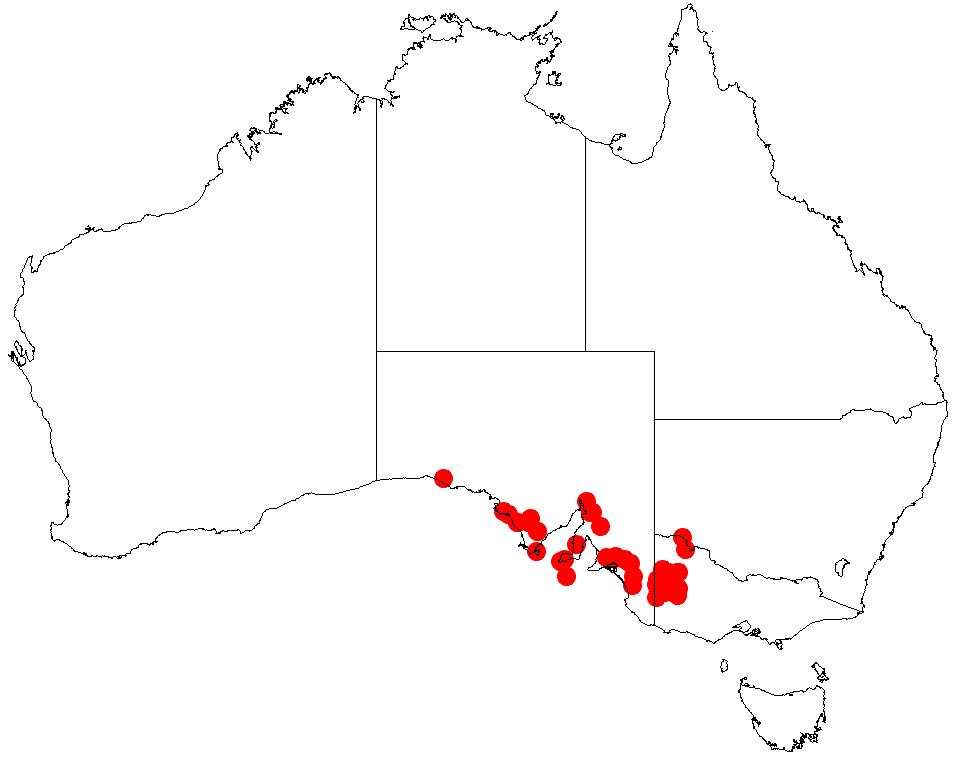
- Occurrence data from AVH

= Acacia dictyocarpa =

Species of plant

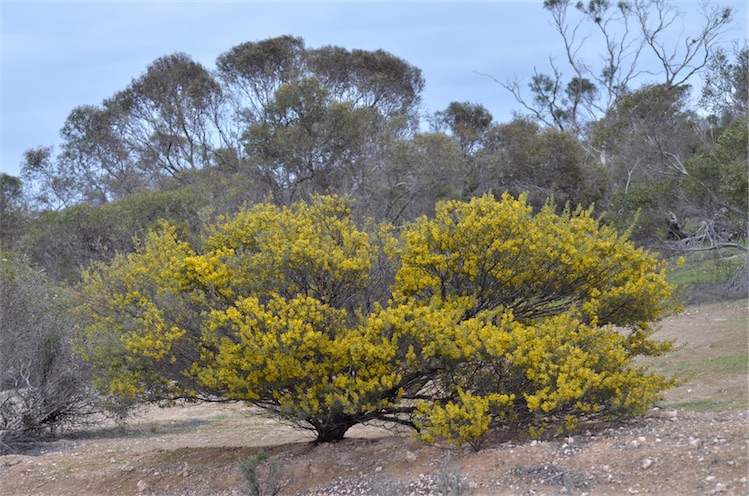
Habit about 13 km (8.1 mi) south-west of Lock, South Australia

Acacia dictyocarpa is a species of flowering plant in the family Fabaceae and is endemic to the south-east of continental Australia. It is a dense, round, spreading shrub with often egg-shaped to lance-shaped phyllodes with the narrower end towards the base, spherical heads of golden yellow flowers and linear, firmly papery to leathery pods.

== Description ==
Acacia dictyocarpa is a dense, round, spreading shrub that typically grows to a height of 1–3 m (3 ft 3 in – 9 ft 10 in) and has branchlets with hairs pressed closely to the surface, and pale yellow, sometimes white to golden new shoots. The phyllodes are often egg-shaped to lance-shaped with the narrower end towards the base, ranging to oblong, 15–30 mm (0.59–1.18 in) long and 5–10 mm (0.20–0.39 in) wide, grey-green to glaucous with hairs similar to those on the branchlets. The flowers are borne in up to six spherical heads in axils on hairy peduncles mostly 4–12 mm (0.16–0.47 in) long, each head with mostly 20 to 36 golden yellow flowers. Flowering occurs between July and October, and the pods are linear, rarely resembling a string of beads, firmly papery to leathery, up to 90 mm (3.5 in) long, 5–8 mm (0.20–0.31 in) wide and dark brown or black, glabrous, often with a light powdery bloom. The seeds are more or less shiny, brown or black, 4.0–5.5 mm (0.16–0.22 in) long with an aril.

== Taxonomy ==
Acacia dictyocarpa was first formally described in 1855 by the botanist George Bentham in the journal Linnaea: Ein Journal für die Botanik in ihrem ganzen Umfange, oder Beiträge zur Pflanzenkunde.

== Distribution and habitat ==
This species of wattle is found from the Wimmera region of Victoria to Yalata in South Australia growing in sandy or loamy soils in mallee or heathy woodland or tall shrubland in undulating country.

== See also ==
- List of Acacia species
