= Elliston =

Elliston can refer to:

Places

- Elliston, Indiana, U.S.
- Elliston, Montana, U.S.
- Elliston, Newfoundland and Labrador, Canada
  - Elliston Ridge Air Station, radar station in Newfoundland and Labrador, Canada
- Elliston, South Australia
  - District Council of Elliston
- Elliston, Virginia, U.S.
- Elliston-Lafayette, Virginia, U.S.
- Joseph Elliston House, a ca. 1817 house in Brentwood, Tennessee, U.S.
- Lands of Elliston, Parish of Lochwinnoch in Scotland

Given name:

- Elliston Campbell (1891–1990), Australian electrical engineer and philanthropist
- Elliston Rahming, Bahamian diplomat, criminologist, educator and politician

Surname:

- George Elliston (1883–1946), American journalist
- George Sampson Elliston (1875–1954), British military officer and politician
- Grace Elliston (died 1950), American theatre actress
- Henry Twiselton Elliston (1801–1864), English musical composer and inventor
- Jesse Elliston (died 1853), proprietor of Elliston & Cavell, a former department store in Oxford, England
- Joseph Thorpe Elliston (1779 -1856), American silversmith, planter and politician
- Robert William Elliston (1774–1831), English actor
- Sydney Robert Elliston (1870-1943) English priest

== See also ==
- Ellis (disambiguation)
- Ellison
