= Flinders Highway =

There are two Australian highways called the Flinders Highway.

- Flinders Highway, South Australia
- Flinders Highway, Queensland
