= Hundred of Colton =

The Hundred of Milne refers to a cadastral unit (land division). It may refer to:

- Hundred of Colton (Northern Territory)
- Hundred of Colton (South Australia)
