= Waterloo Bay massacre =

Clash between Indigenous Australians and European settlers on the South Australian coast

- Part of Australian frontier wars
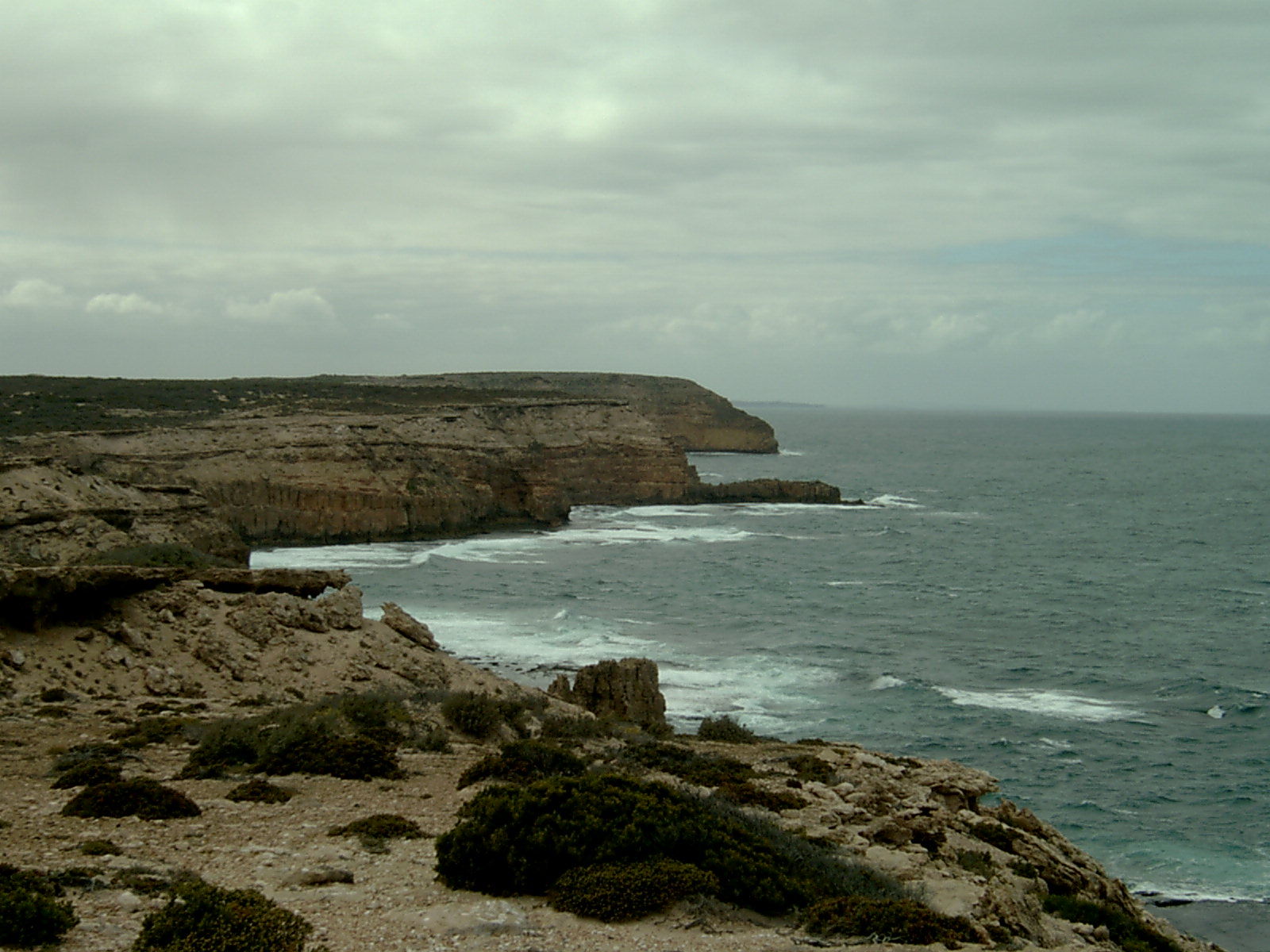
- The cliffs of Waterloo Bay
- Location: 33°39′S 134°53′E; Elliston, South Australia
- Date: May 1849
- Target: Aboriginal Australians
- Deaths: See Authenticity and interpretations section
- Perpetrator: European settlers

The Waterloo Bay massacre, also known as the Elliston massacre, was a clash between European settlers and Aboriginal Australians that took place on the cliffs of Waterloo Bay near Elliston, South Australia, in late May 1849. Part of the Australian frontier wars, the most recent scholarship indicates that it is likely that it resulted in the deaths of tens or scores of Aboriginal people. The events leading up to the fatal clash included the killings of three European settlers by Aboriginal people, the killing of one Aboriginal person, and the death by poisoning of five others by European settlers. The limited archival records indicate that three Aboriginal people were killed or died of wounds from the clash and five were captured, although accounts of the killing of up to 260 Aboriginal people at the cliffs have circulated since at least 1880.

Aboriginal people from the west coast of South Australia have oral history traditions that a large-scale massacre occurred. In the 1920s and 1930s, several historians examined the archival record and concluded that there is no formal or direct evidence of a massacre on a large scale, and opined that the recorded events were exaggerated by storytellers over time. More recently, another historian concluded that the rumours relating to a massacre are founded in fact, and that some form of punitive action did take place on the cliffs of Waterloo Bay, but that it had been embellished into a myth.

An attempt in the 1970s to build a memorial for the Aboriginal people killed in the massacre was unsuccessful, as the District Council of Elliston demanded proof that the massacre occurred before permitting a cairn to be placed on the cliffs. The deaths of the European settlers killed in the lead-up to the clash have been memorialised to some extent; in 2017 the Elliston District Council erected a memorial to acknowledge what occurred. In recent years authors have concluded that, whether or not a massacre occurred on the large scale suggested by some accounts, the clash has become something of a "narrative battleground" between the documented and imagined history of European settlement and the Aboriginal oral history of the frontier. In May 2018, the Elliston District Council received a national award for their work in memorialising the massacre. The event has also been included in the Colonial Frontiers Massacres Map, researched and developed by the University of Newcastle.

== Background ==
The colony of South Australia

In March 1839, European settlers arrived from Adelaide, the capital of the colony of South Australia, to establish Port Lincoln on the east coast of the Eyre Peninsula. There were significant clashes between settlers and Aboriginal people in the years that followed, as settlers spread out to establish pastoral runs around the township. This fighting formed part of the Australian frontier wars. In 1842, soldiers were sent to Port Lincoln from Adelaide to help protect the settlers, but the remoteness from Adelaide, and the vaguely defined powers and limited policing resources of the Government Resident, the local representative of the colonial government, meant that there were serious limitations on the rule of law in the region. This was especially true with respect to Aboriginal people, who were supposed to be treated as British subjects in the same way as the settlers.

In common with other areas of South Australia, and Australia as a whole, settlers on the frontier employed various tactics to deal with Aboriginal resistance to being forced off their traditional lands. Initially these revolved around keeping them at a distance using threats of violence, but they soon escalated to terrorising Aboriginal people to stop them interfering with stock and other property, tactics which sometimes resulted in violent clashes. Violence by settlers towards Aboriginal people often went unreported to the authorities, and became more secretive after a settler was hanged in 1847 for murdering an Aboriginal man, the only such sentence in South Australia's pioneer history. This frontier violence has been described by the authors Foster, Hosking and Nettelbeck as an undeclared covert war between settlers and Aboriginal people.

Between June 1848 and May 1849, there were a series of incidents between settlers and resident Aboriginal people in the Elliston district, located 169 kilometres (105 mi) northwest of Port Lincoln. This region was inhabited by Aboriginal Nauo, Kokatha and Wirangu people. In the first of these incidents, John Hamp, a hutkeeper on the Stony Point sheep station, was speared and clubbed to death by Aboriginal people on 23 June 1848. The second incident occurred in August when at least one Aboriginal person was shot by the overseer of the same station for stealing a shirt. In May 1849, five Aboriginal people – two adults, two boys and an infant – died after eating poisoned flour stolen by an Aboriginal man from William Ranson Mortlock's station near Yeelanna. The man from whom the flour was stolen was arrested and charged with murder, but sailed for the United States soon after being released by the authorities. According to the Commissioner of Police, this poisoning may have led to two Aboriginal revenge killings of settlers later that month. On 3 May, James Rigby Beevor was speared to death at his hut, and four days later Annie Easton was speared to death on an adjoining lease. Her unharmed infant was found beside her body.

== Recorded events ==
According to official records, on 27 May 1849, stores were taken from a hut on Thomas Cooper Horn's station and a hutkeeper and shepherd were threatened by Aboriginal people, who left with the goods they had taken. The station owner and some of his station hands pursued the group, and when they caught up with the fleeing party of Aboriginal people shots were fired and spears thrown. The Aboriginal group split in two, and Horn and his men followed one party to the Waterloo Bay cliffs, which the group tried to climb down to make their escape. Horn and his men opened fire, and two Aboriginal people were killed and one fatally wounded; several more were captured.

The Government Resident and the police inspector from Port Lincoln both wrote detailed accounts of the incident, neither mentioning the many casualties. One specified that only two Aboriginal people were killed. In September, a group of Aboriginal men were transported to Adelaide for trial. Two were convicted of Beevor's murder and were transported back to the Elliston district, where they were hanged outside his hut. Three were charged with the murder of Easton, but were acquitted due to lack of evidence. Others were charged over the confrontation at the hut on Horn's station. Shortly after this, two more Aboriginal men were arrested in Port Lincoln by the police and charged with the murder of Hamp. Found guilty and sentenced to death, they were later released when doubts were raised about the testimony of Aboriginal witnesses located by the police. In February 1852 another Aboriginal male was arrested as an accomplice in Hamp's murder, but after being transported to Adelaide, he too was released for lack of evidence. He tried to walk home to his country, and was murdered by four Aboriginal men for trespassing.

== Later accounts of a massacre ==
Locations of Elliston and Adelaide

On 14 August 1880, an account of the events of the late 1840s on the Eyre Peninsula, written by the adventurer, journalist and preacher Henry John Congreve, was published in the Adelaide Observer, a weekly newspaper, as "A Reminiscence of Port Lincoln". The authors Robert Foster, Rick Hosking and Amanda Nettelbeck describe this as a "fanciful and sometimes wildly inaccurate fictionalising" of what occurred. It ascribed four murders to one Aboriginal male, stated that Easton's infant had also been murdered, said that many Aboriginal people were shot and survivors driven over a cliff, and mixed up several of the recorded details. In a letter to the editor, a correspondent noted several errors in the account, and Congreve was asked to respond. He stated that he never intended the story to have the "weight of a historical document", and that it was written merely as "illustrative of the trials and dangers of the early settlers". According to Foster and his co-authors, Congreve's account was "not history, but fiction designed to illustrate", which had "exaggerated and distorted what had (probably) happened".

The next account of the 1848–49 events in the Elliston district was a short story called "Doctor" written by the author Ellen Liston, and published in the Adelaide Observer of 17 June 1882. It was based loosely on the murder of Annie Easton, although the protagonist was pregnant and was not herself killed, but lost her baby as a result of the attack. In Liston's story, the "hands" from surrounding stations then undertook a "crusade against the natives". Foster, Hosking and Nettelbeck note that the Government Resident's clerk reported on 16 May 1849 that three parties of volunteers were out looking for the Aboriginal people responsible for the Beevor and Easton murders. Liston's story was reprinted twice in 1936, the centennial year of South Australia. In the first case, Liston's story was reprinted with the removal of three paragraphs—one about "troublesome blacks", another about the protagonist's sense of a "vast and terrible stillness", and the third about the "hands" conducting a "crusade against the natives". In the second case, Liston's story was reproduced verbatim.

By the turn of the century, what has been described by a Foster, Hosking and Nettelbeck as a "well-developed local legend" was circulating about the "Elliston incident". In 1906, a travel guide, The Real West Coast: A Picture of a Rumour-Damaged Country, was published by E. W. Parish. In it, Parish related that while travelling in the area he had heard different versions of a "tragic legend" regarding a massacre. The key elements of this legend were that Hamp's severed head was found in a camp oven at his hut by his 12-year-old son, John Chipp Hamp, that the Aboriginal people responsible for the murders had been rounded up by a group of horsemen and herded over the cliffs, and that there were many Aboriginal casualties. In 1915, a former policeman from the district who had served there well after the events described had his recollections published in the South Australian Register newspaper. His version included all the now-familiar aspects of the legend, including the head in the camp oven, but also the detail that Hamp's son had been held captive by Aboriginal people for three months before he was rescued. There was no evidence given in the Supreme Court trial of his murderers that supports the idea that Hamp was decapitated, or that his son was present when his body was discovered or that he was abducted.

In 1926, a letter to the editor of the Register asking about the origin of the name Waterloo Bay sparked a lively exchange between a Register journalist and west coast local Archie Beviss and others. According to Foster and his co-authors, Beviss was relying on local hearsay about the massacre, and he is now associated with the "most bloodthirsty versions of the legend". Beviss claimed to have been told about the massacre by several people, including Hamp's son, as well as James Geharty, one of the police officers involved in investigating the murders. Beviss stated that Hamp's son was a 16-year-old shepherd at the time of his father's murder, and that he had found his father's head, which had been cut off with a crosscut saw, in a camp oven. According to Beviss, after the murder of Easton, Geharty urged the government to take action, and after approval was given, a force of 160 men was raised. The force then drove about 260 Aboriginal people over the cliffs. Finally, Beviss stated that Geharty named Waterloo Bay after the massacre. Foster, Hosking and Nettelbeck have identified several inconsistencies in Beviss' account: Geharty did not name Waterloo Bay; Beviss named Easton's husband as being involved in the drive against the Aboriginal people, but James Easton went to Adelaide after his wife's murder and never returned; there is no evidence that the government sanctioned the raising of a force; and if 160 men participated in the drive, the authors question why no first-hand accounts of the massacre exist.

Despite its inaccuracies, the Beviss account had a strong influence on later retellings of the story. For many years, both John Chipp Hamp and Geharty figured prominently in stories of the massacre. According to several accounts, Hamp's son was also involved in spreading the story of his father's death, including the episode of the head in the camp oven, and that he was the one who discovered the body. Geharty was also mentioned by several of those telling the story but, again, there are serious questions about the accuracy of his statements. In 1932, a version was told in The Advertiser in which a party of 200 bushmen drove a group of Aboriginal people to the cliffs, but there was possibly only one victim. The writer claimed he had been told this by Geharty. From 1926 onwards, most accounts of the massacre usually referred to the archival and newspaper record and noted that there was no evidence for a massacre on the scale of that claimed by Congreve, Beviss or John Chipp Hamp. In 1936, the historian James Dugald Somerville wrote a series of articles in the Port Lincoln Times regarding early settler life on the Eyre Peninsula, in which he concluded that "it is a certainty that the Waterloo Bay 'massacre', as pictured by H.J.C. [Congreve],.. A. Beviss and others did not occur, and that the natives did not cut the head off Hamps' body and place it in the camp oven".

In 1937, it was suggested by the Adelaide newspaper, The Chronicle, that the gazetted name for the bay around which Elliston is built, Waterloo Bay, is a reference to the Aborigines who "met their Waterloo" there in the 1840s. The presence of adjacent landmarks with gazetted names associated with the Duke of Wellington's defeat of Napoleon at the Battle of Waterloo, such as Wellesley Point and Wellington Point, and the fact that the names were not associated with those places until 13 years after the massacre, raise questions about this interpretation.

In 1969, local author Neil Thompson published a book, The Elliston Incident, which included the camp oven story and said that Geharty (spelled Gehirty in the book) was involved in rounding up Aboriginal people and driving them over the cliffs south of Elliston, resulting in 20 deaths. For many years, Aboriginal people from the west coast of South Australia have retold the story of a massacre at Elliston as part of their oral history.

== Memorialisation ==
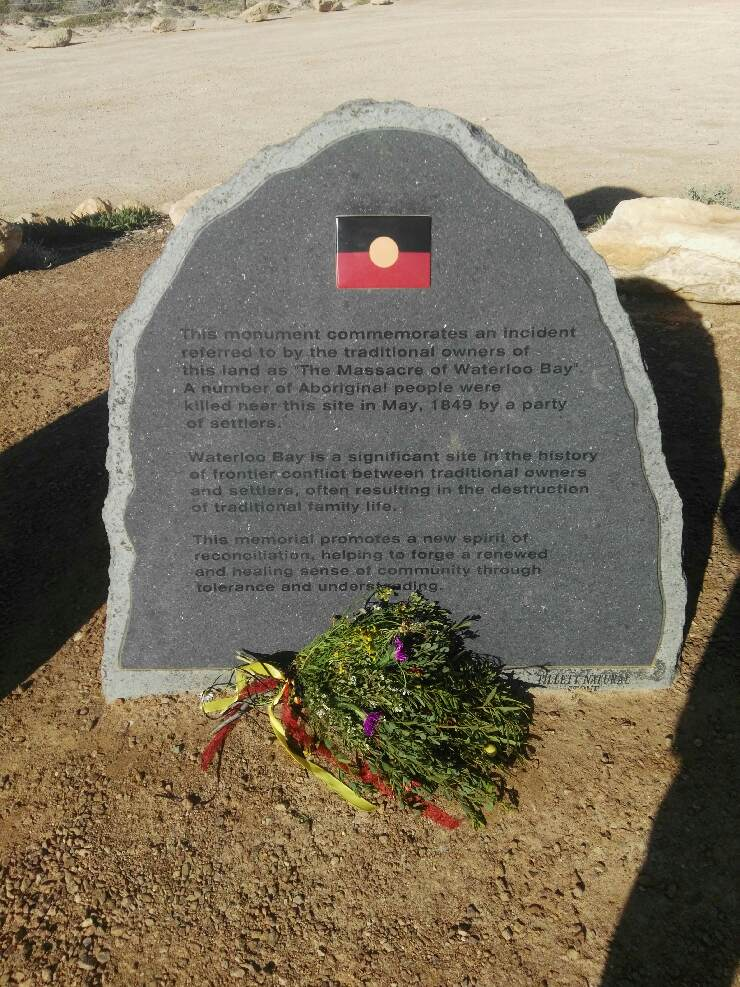
The 2017 memorial plaque at Elliston commemorating the massacre

In 1970, the Federal Council for the Advancement of Aboriginals and Torres Strait Islanders and the South Australian Aborigines Progress Association (SAAPA) unveiled a plan to build a cairn on the cliffs at Waterloo Bay to "commemorate a massacre of 250 Aboriginal people by white settlers in 1846". It was intended that the cairn would be part of a national mourning campaign by Aboriginal people, timed to coincide with the bicentenary of the landing of Captain James Cook at Botany Bay in New South Wales in 1770. John Moriarty, the deputy president of SAAPA, said that "the Elliston massacre was part of the history of the West Coast Aboriginal population, despite strenuous efforts by the relatives of the whites involved to discredit what is a well-known fact".

The chairman of the District Council of Elliston, J. B. Cameron, said that the council would agree to the cairn being built if it could be proved that the massacre took place. He also said that a memorial to Aboriginal people who lost their lives in the early development of the area might be built. Foster, Hosking and Nettelbeck note that this offer was presumably on the condition that there would not be any reference to the alleged massacre at Waterloo Bay. This story, published in The Advertiser, resulted in a series of letters to the newspaper, from people with a range of differing viewpoints about the massacre story. These included assertions of the existence of an oral history among Aboriginal people of the west coast that a massacre did occur.

In December 1971, a small granite memorial to Hamp was erected at the site of his hut, and in the early 1970s the locations of events leading up the alleged massacre were marked by P. J. Baillie. These included the sites of the Beevor and Easton huts, the tree from which Beevor's murderers were hanged, and Easton's grave at Lake Hamilton. Until 2017, no memorial to the Aboriginal people killed in the lead-up to or during the fatal clash had been erected.

In May 2017 a memorial to the events at Waterloo Bay had been unveiled by the local council at Elliston, and after some discussion in the district over whether what happened there should be referred to as a massacre or an incident, the council agreed on including the word "massacre" on the plaque. The opening ceremony included dancing by Aboriginal dance troupe Dusty Feet Mob from Port Augusta, and was attended by Labor Senator Pat Dodson. The moment was celebrated as an act of reconciliation and healing. Aboriginal people had avoided Elliston as a taboo area ever since the massacre, but would henceforth be able to visit and pass through it.

The Elliston council's work to acknowledge the massacre through the memorial was recognised in the 2018 National Local Government Awards in the "Promoting Indigenous Recognition" category. The mayor who presided over the sometimes rancorous process through which the memorial was established, Kym Callaghan, later said that he was very proud that the massacre had been properly recognised, and observed that "it's like a big dark cloud has been lifted off the town". He ascribed his defeat in the November 2018 mayoral election to a backlash over his role with the project. When Callaghan was awarded the Medal of the Order of Australia in the 2021 Australia Day Honours for his service to local government and the Elliston community, he said that helping establish the memorial had been among his "proudest achievements".

== Authenticity and interpretations ==
According to Foster, Hosking and Nettelbeck, the most rigorous inquiries into the alleged massacre have been made by four professional and amateur historians, A. T. Saunders, Somerville, Baillie, and Greg Charter. Saunders was the Register journalist who engaged with Beviss in the pages of that newspaper in 1926, and relied on the official records made by the Government Resident and police inspector, which do not support the massacre story. Somerville examined the limited records held by the South Australian Archives, and concluded in 1936 that there was no formal evidence of a massacre, and that the confrontation at Horn's hut precipitated the "myth". Baillie worked with Somerville and agreed with his conclusions, adding that the facts of the incident at Horn's hut had been used by "ambitious raconteurs [to] superimpose ... the massacre story, elevating modest fact to unbridled fancy". In 1989, Charter re-examined the archival evidence, and concluded that it "appears likely that the rumours relating to the Elliston Massacre have a foundation in fact, and that some form of punitive action did take place on the cliffs of Waterloo Bay, upon which an exaggerated myth had developed".

In 1993, Aboriginal people from the west coast were still relating their oral history regarding a massacre, with the recorder of these interviews, Pat Sumerling, stating that, "[a]s the Aboriginal oral tradition is of crucial importance to their culture, with traditions handed down from generation to generation, one cannot dismiss their disturbing claims". Foster, Hosking and Nettelbeck also interviewed Aboriginal people from the west coast on several occasions about the incident, with broad agreement in several aspects; the location near Elliston, that about 250 were herded together and forced over the cliffs, and additionally, that not all of the Aboriginal group were killed, the majority concealing themselves at the foot of the cliff until the settlers left. In 2000, the author Iris Burgoyne wrote of the oral history about the massacre:

[T]his story was passed to me by my people. Their spoken words were always the truth. As young girls at Koonibba, we sat and listened to the old people like Jack Joonary, Jilgina Jack and Wombardy. They were well over a hundred. They shared many of their experiences. They told us about how they survived the Elliston massacres in about 1839 and 1849. Jack Jacobs from Franklin Harbour, old lame Paddy and Dick Dory spoke about it as well. That day they escaped death as they tricked the European horsemen and ran into the bushes. They stood and watched in horror as their people were driven off the cliffs into the sea. [...].

As part of the investigations that led to the establishment of the memorial, the Elliston council engaged an anthropologist, Tim Haines, to examine the event. He concluded that "[w]e won't ever know for certain what exactly happened on the cliffs overlooking Waterloo Bay", but indicated that while it was unlikely that hundreds of Aboriginal people were killed there, it was likely that tens or scores were killed.

Foster, Hosking and Nettelbeck conclude that whether or not the scale of the bloodshed equaled the massacre described in some versions of the story, the fact that it continues to be retold reflects a "deep unease about the communal memory of frontier history" in South Australia. Quoting the observation of the historian J. J. Healy that incidents such as this have become "narrative battlegrounds", they stress that these competing narratives are divided into people who are sympathetic to the plight of the Aboriginal people on the frontier, and those who wish to praise the "bold, resolute and resourceful" actions of the early settlers facing the threat Aboriginal people posed to settlement. One conservative estimate holds that 80 settlers died in South Australia during the frontier wars, while a highly speculative estimate of Aboriginal deaths places that toll between 400 and 800.
