= Edward Squire (public servant) =

British public servant

Edward Lancaster Fawcett Squire (25 September 1837 – 7 October 1893) was Deputy Postmaster General and Superintendent of Telegraphs, in the colony of South Australia.

== History ==
Squire was born the youngest son of Lieut William Squire RN (c. 1790 – 20 July 1864), an English ship's captain, on board his ship, in Montreal harbor. He was educated at Christ's Hospital (the original Bluecoat School), and the family moved to Victoria around 1850. In 1859 he moved to South Australia, joined the Telegraph Department, and was posted at Robe. In 1866 he was transferred to Wentworth, New South Wales. In February 1871 he was transferred to Gawler, South Australia. In 1875, he was promoted to the General Post Office as Deputy Postmaster-General and Secretary. On 25 August 1875 he was appointed to the dual position of Deputy Postmaster-General and Superintendent of Telegraphs under the Postmaster General, Charles Todd, whose position he temporarily filled on occasion.

He was killed when the trap he was driving down the Old Belair Road capsized after its brakes failed and the horses bolted, and its occupants thrown on the road. His son Tristram and daughters Emily and Fanny and a female relative escaped serious injury, and their maid servant, Miss Chew, sustained a broken arm.

== Recognition ==
The Hundred of Squire was named for him.

== Family ==
Edward L. F. Squire married Jane Cock (c. 1838 – 23 February 1862) in 1860; she died of consumption; he married again, to Annie George Brewer (c. 1844 – 31 July 1917) on 16 September 1863, both of Robe, South Australia.

- Edward William Squire (1861–1862)
- (William) Tristram Henry Squire (1864 – 15 December 1881)
- Philip James Squire (1866–1937) married. He was clerk of the Local Court, Alice Springs in 1900
- Edward Brewer Squire (18 October 1868 – 31 August 1950) married Annie Mabel Snelling (6 May 1873 – 15 March 1930) on 6 April 1898
- Eleanor Mary Squire (1872– )
- Charles Frederick/Fredrick Squire (1874–1885)
- Frank Stockley Squire (1876 – 20 January 1952) married Lilian May Manuel (1877–1956) on 16 February 1895, lived at Robe.
- Elizabeth Ethel Squire (1878 – 2 October 1942) married George Alexander Baker (c. 1879 – 9 August 1941) in 1901
- Francis Annie Squire (11 May 1884 – 8 October 1952) married Arthur Reginald Malin (1880 – 19 August 1952) on 28 December 1901
