= Hincks Conservation Park =

Protected area in South Australia

- IUCN category VI (protected area with sustainable use of natural resources)
- Location within South Australia
- Location: South Australia
- Nearest city: Lock
- Coordinates: 33°52′56.8″S 135°45′51.5″E
- Area: 8.78 km^{2} (3.39 sq mi)
- Established: 1 January 1941
- Governing body: Department for Environment and Water

Hincks Conservation Park is a protected area in the Australian state of South Australia on the Eyre Peninsula located about 95 kilometres (59 miles) north of Port Lincoln and 35 kilometres (22 miles) south east of Lock in the gazetted locality of Tooligie.

The conservation park was proclaimed under the National Parks and Wildlife Act 1972 in 1972 in relation to a parcel of land of which part had enjoyed protected area status since 1941. The majority of the land forming the conservation park as of 2014 was part of a conservation reserve proclaimed under the Crown Lands Act 1929 in 1993 and which was added to the conservation park in 2004 prior to the majority of the land holding being excised to create the Hincks Wilderness Protection Area.

The conservation park was named after Sir Cecil Stephen Hincks, who was the SA Minister of Lands, Irrigation and Repatriation (1946–1963).

It is classified as an IUCN Category VI protected area.

== Landscape ==
The park is predominantly mallee formation. The northerly portion consists of deep siliceous neutral sand built into a system of parallel dunes, while in the southern and western parts the sands are alkaline, calcareous and shallow, arranged into irregular dunes. In the east are two prominent quartz outcrops, Verran Hill and Blue Range.

== See also ==
- Protected areas of South Australia
