= Hanbidge =

Hanbidge is a surname. Notable people with the surname include:

- Liz Hanbidge, American politician
- Robert Hanbidge (1891–1974), Canadian lawyer and politician

== See also ==
- Hambidge
