= Lake Newland Conservation Park =

Protected area in South Australia

- IUCN category Ia (strict nature reserve)
- Location within South Australia
- Location: South Australia
- Nearest city: Elliston
- Coordinates: 33°24′18″S 134°51′16″E
- Area: 88.8 km^{2} (34.3 sq mi)
- Established: 1 August 1991
- Governing body: Department for Environment and Water
- Website: Official website

Lake Newland Conservation Park is a protected area in the Australian state of South Australia located on the west coast of the Eyre Peninsula about 10 kilometres (6.2 mi) north of the town of Elliston. It was proclaimed in 1991 to protect Lake Newland, a hypersaline lake, and an associated wetland complex. It lies in the traditional lands of the Wirangu people.

== History and description ==
The conservation park is located within the gazetted localities (from south to north) of Elliston, Colton, and Talia. It stretches 20 kilometres (12 mi) along a coastal strip, and includes the large sand dunes which lie between the lake and the sea.

Land within the conservation park has a relatively recent geological history, with Holocene sand dunes creating a barrier between the Southern Ocean and a depression in the Bridgewater Formation of Pleistocene limestone that is common throughout the western Eyre Peninsula.

The traditional owners of the land, an Aboriginal people of the west coast of South Australia known as the Wirangu, were forced off their land in the 1800s as European settlers moved into the area and started farming the area inland of the lake, blocking their access to the lake, dunes and sea. After the Elliston massacre in May 1849 at Waterloo Bay, the whole area became taboo to Aboriginal people, and they did not set foot in it until 2018, when a cleansing ceremony was performed.

Lake Newland was named by Edward John Eyre for his friend and travelling companion Richard Francis Newland, during his Eyre's 1839 expeditions to the west.

The conservation park was proclaimed in 1991 (named after the lake), with some additional land being added in 1996.

It is classified as an IUCN Category Ia protected area. The dunes continue to encroach on the lake, lagoons and other wetlands in the park, which are also fed by freshwater springs in the limestone. Average annual rainfall (recorded at Elliston) is 427 millimetres (16.8 in).

== Vegetation ==
The conservation park contains mobile sand dunes and sub-coastal wetlands. The vegetation includes areas of previously cleared land with patches of regenerating drooping sheoak woodland and scattered native shrubs. The lake margins are dominated by salt-tolerant Sarcocornia and Tecticornia species. The coastal shrublands that cover much of the reserve are mainly composed of coastal daisybush, with coast beard-heath, seaberry saltbush, long-pod wattle, coastal umbrella bush and cockies tongues. The foredunes behind the beach contain Spinifex hirsutus grassland as well as coast saltbush and knobby club-rush. Swales are characterised by swamp paperbarks and dryland tea-trees over salt-tolerant shrubs.

== Other designations ==
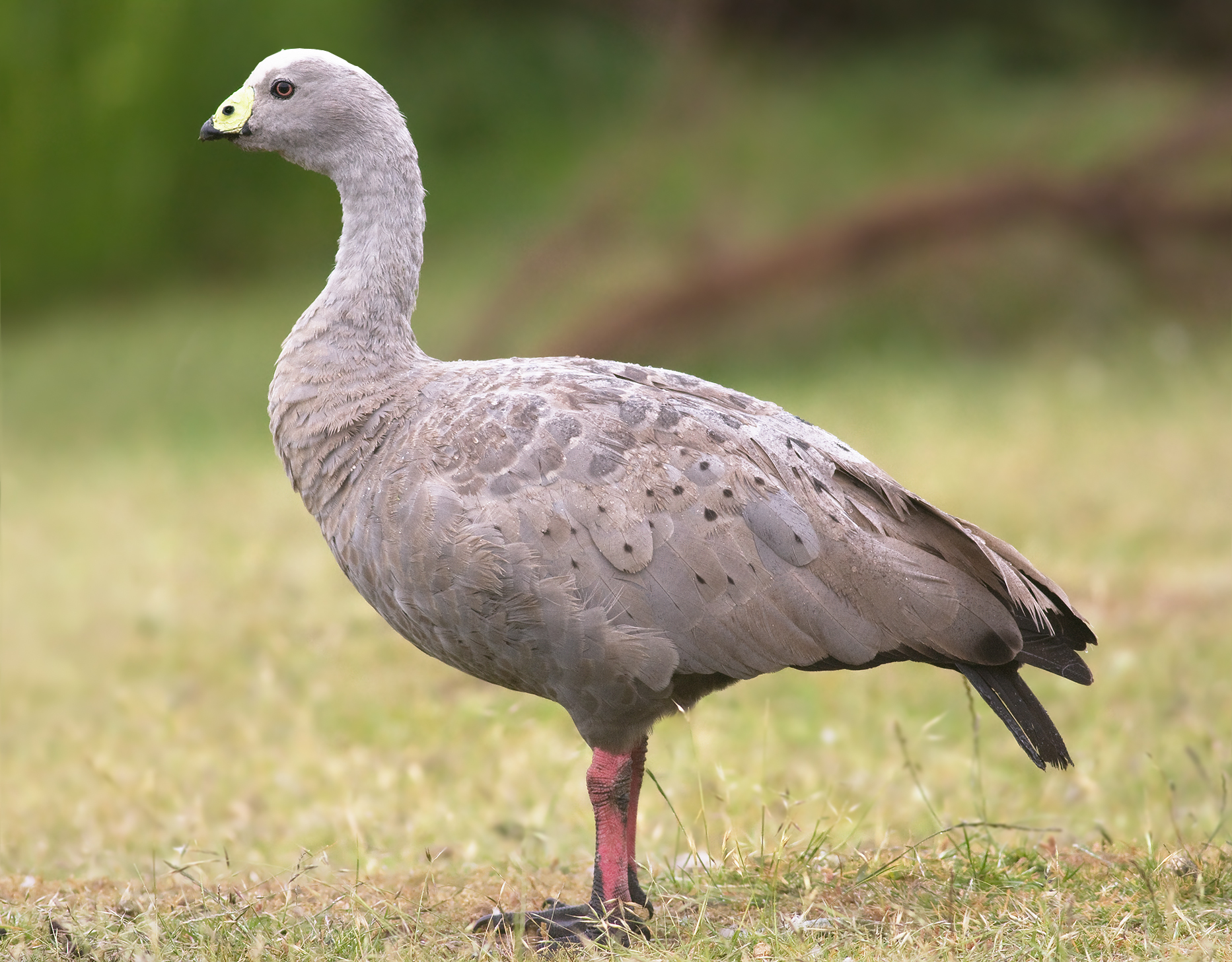
The conservation park is an important area for Cape Barren geese

The full extent of the conservation park is overlapped by an Important Bird Area (IBA) known as the Lake Newland Important Bird Area. The IBA which is a non-statutory arrangement has been identified by BirdLife International because it regularly supports over 1% of the world population of Cape Barren geese, as dry-season visitors from their offshore island breeding grounds, and significant numbers of fairy terns and hooded plovers. Slender-billed thornbills also occur in the park.

== In Aboriginal mythology ==
Lake Newland is steeped in Aboriginal Australian mythology, specifically that of the Wirangu people. It is connected to the story of the Seven Sisters (based on the star constellation known as the Pleiades), a creation story embodied in a songline of great significance. In the story, a hunter named Tgilby (the Orion constellation), after falling in love with the seven sisters (Pleiades), known as Yugarilya, chases them out of the sky and onto and across the earth. He chases them as the Yugarilya chase a snake, Dyunu.
