= Sheringa, South Australia =

Sheringa Dyaringa (Nauo) South Australia
- Coordinates: 33.84807°S 135.23285°E
- Population: 32 (SAL 2021)
- Postcode(s): 5607
- Location: 113 km (70 mi) northwest of Port Lincoln
- LGA(s): District Council of Elliston
- State electorate(s): Flinders
- Federal division(s): Grey
Localities around Sheringa:
Bramfield	Kappawanta	Kappawanta
Great Australian Bight	Sheringa	Tooligie
Great Australian Bight	Kiana	Kiana

Sheringa (Nauo: Dyaringa) is a coastal locality on the western side of Eyre Peninsula in South Australia on the Great Australian Bight.

The Flinders Highway runs through Sheringa. Sheringa is located on the highway, containing a hall, Church, CFS and Roadhouse. Surf Life Saving Australia describes Sheringa Beach as "a relatively popular spot for sightseers, while the local surfers and fishers use the beach".

== History ==
In August 1843, Joseph Cummings, aged 16, born in England, and Samuel Harris, aged 14, born in the United States, became only the second westerners to trek through the Eyre Peninsula, following in explorer Edward John Eyre's footsteps, and using a coastal map prepared by Matthew Flinders from his circumnavigation of Australia in 1802. They had left the Fowlers Bay whaling station to walk to civilisation, because of the torrid conditions in which they found themselves. They walked 650 kilometres (400 miles) to Point Drummond where a ship was seen, and took them to Port Lincoln. A local magistrate heard their story, and freed them on the condition that they guided a survey party to the region of good farming land they described, at what became Sheringa. He also granted them parcels of land there, that they farmed.

The town of Sheringa was surveyed in October 1882. It was initially proclaimed as Holsworthy on 19 April 1883, then revoked and proclaimed as Sheringa on 23 August 1883. Its name is derived from Tjeiringa, a local Aboriginal name for a yam-like root that grew in the area. The former Sheringa Post Office opened on 1 September 1891 and closed on 28 September 1984.

The Wesleyan Methodist church granted permission to construct a church building at Sheringa at its district meeting in 1886. In 1898, the town consisted "...of a temperance hotel, a general store, and blacksmith's shop under one roof, and a public building, which is used as a Church, a school, and a dancing-room." St. John's Anglican Church opened in 1910.

The historic Round Lake Washing Pool, a former sheep wash located near Sheringa, is listed on the South Australian Heritage Register. Washing pools were used before 1870 to wash sheep prior to shearing. This wash pond was built in the 1840s and used by several adjacent sheep runs to clean the sheep before shearing. After about 1870, fleece did not need to be cleaned by the farmers before sale, as manufacturers could produce lanolin as a by-product of cleaning the fleece themselves.

The one road sign in Sheringa, "Nowhere Else road", has attracted attention for its unusual name.
