= Tooligie, South Australia =

Tooligie South Australia
- Coordinates: 33.85°S 135.70°E
- Population: 25 (SAL 2016)
- Established: 1929
- Postcode(s): 5607
- Time zone: ACST (UTC+9:30)
  - Summer (DST): ACST (UTC+10:30)
- Location: 84 km (52 mi) N of Port Lincoln; 291 km (181 mi) w of Adelaide city centre
- LGA(s): District Council of Elliston
- State electorate(s): Flinders
- Federal division(s): Grey
Mean max temp	Mean min temp	Annual rainfall
22.1 °C; 72 °F	11.4 °C; 53 °F	400.6 mm 15.8 in
Localities around Tooligie:
Kappawanta	Kappawanta; Murdinga	Murlong
Sheringa	Tooligie	Hincks
Kiana	Kiana; Mitchell; Karkoo	Brooker
- Footnotes: Locations; Coordinates; Climate; Adjoining localities

Tooligie is a small town in South Australia on the Eyre Peninsula about 290 kilometres (180 miles) west of the Adelaide city centre and about 84 kilometres (52 miles) north of the city of Port Lincoln.

Tooligie was declared as a government town by Governor Hore Ruthven on 30 May 1929. The boundaries of the locality which do include the former government town were created in November 1999. The name is reported to have been derived from a hill located to the east of the town.

The following protected areas are located within Tooligie - the Hincks Conservation Park and the Peachna Conservation Park.

The Tod Highway and the Cummins to Wudinna branch of the Eyre Peninsula Railway both pass through the locality with a railway station being located at the site of the former government town.

Tooligie is located within the federal division of Grey, the state electoral district of Flinders and the local government area of the District Council of Elliston.

== See also ==
- List of cities and towns in South Australia
