= Ellen Liston =

Australian writer and educator

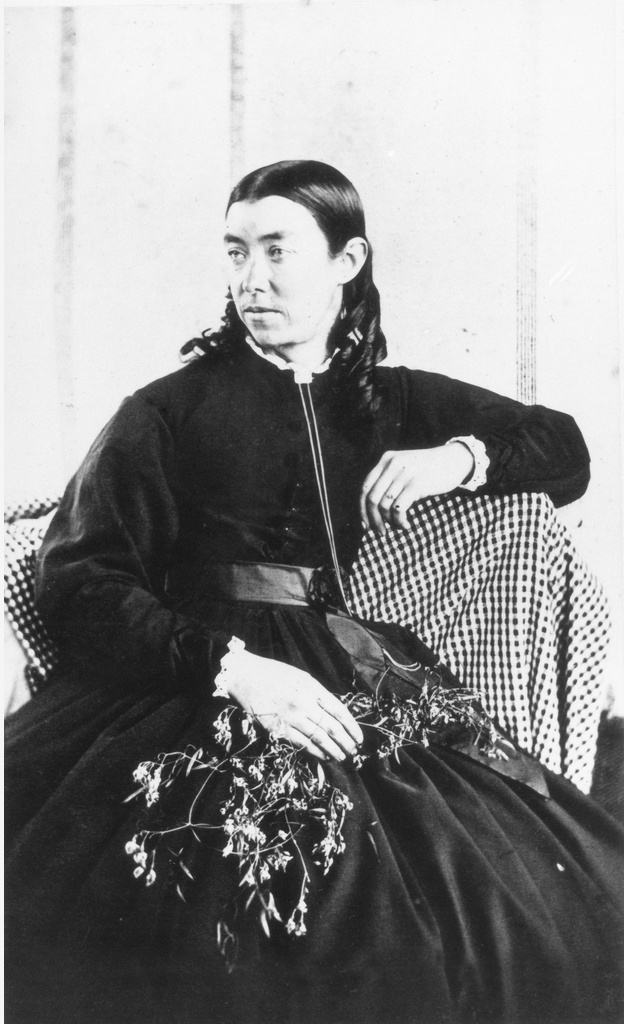
Portrait of Ellen Liston at Nilkerloo Station, South Australia circa 1870

Ellen Liston (1838–1885) was an Australian teacher and a writer of early popular fiction.

== Early life ==
Ellen Liston was born in England, one of five children of David John Liston (died 1863, aged 66) and Mary Ann Liston (née Bone, died 1865). David Liston was a wine and spirit merchant, listed as the landlord of the Dover Castle public house in London in 1848. When Liston was 12 the family migrated to Adelaide, South Australia, on the ship Candahar. They built a house, "Idsworth Cottage" in Parkside. Liston was a delicate child and was educated at home. Following the death of her parents, she and one unmarried brother were left living at the family home. Liston subsequently worked as a governess on Nikerloo Station near Bramfield on Eyre Peninsula from 1867. In addition to her teaching duties, she claimed to be the only female manager of a sheep station. At this time she began writing, with stories and verses published in the Adelaide Observer under the name "Ellie L." from June 1869.

== Career ==
Five years later Liston was one of the first intake into the newly organised South Australian State Education system. Her first teaching appointment was at Wellington on the River Murray. As there was no house near the school she lived on the west side of the river, and as a result of this she had, in flood times, to wade through water on her way to and from school. This brought about an illness from which she never fully recovered. Liston resigned from teaching and worked as the first female telegraph operator in the GPO in Adelaide (possibly the first in Australia). She was later mistress of the Post and Telegraph Office at Watervale and then at Marrabel, where she did most of her writing. She was on the corresponding staff of the Kapunda Herald, where some of her stories and verses were published. She also contributed to the Adelaide Observer. In 1879 Liston won a prize offered by the Melbourne Leader for her serialised novel Auckland Marston, appearing in that newspaper from November 1879 to February 1880. Liston's early work has been compared to the short fiction of Barbara Baynton and Henry Lawson, in their depiction of women alone in an Australian bush setting which is seen as threatening, dangerous and mysterious. Despite two offers of marriage, Liston remained single and much of her work features strong women who lead fulfilling lives.

== Later life ==
Liston died in 1885, aged 47, in the town of Marrabel, near Kapunda, and is buried in the Kapunda cemetery. The South Australian coastal town of Elliston is believed by some to be named after her. She left behind an unpublished manuscript for a book, Jean Kesson.

== Works ==
=== Books ===
- Pioneers: stories, E. A. Harwood, Hassell Press, Adelaide, 1936
- Auckland Marston: An Australian Story, Melbourne Leader, 1879
- The Stauntons, The Adelaide Observer, 20 May 1871 Reproduced 13 May - 29 July 1971

=== Poems ===
In E. A. Harwood (ed.), Pioneers : stories, Hassell Press, Adelaide, 1936

- 'A Cloudy Day', p. 85
- 'To a Summer baby' p. 85
- 'Grandmother's Musings' p. 8
- 'Truth and Love' p. 30
- 'Fancies' pp. 52–53
- 'Mid-Life' p. 67
- 'A Tumble' p. 80
- 'Gone' p. 98
- 'Year's End' p. 116
- 'The Fire King' pp. 137–138

=== Short stories ===
In E. A. Harwood (ed.), Pioneers : stories, Hassell Press, Adelaide, 1936

- 'Doctor' pp. 54–66
- 'My Neighbour's Mystery' pp. 1–7
- 'What They Would Do With It' pp. 169–177
- 'Our Domestic Helps' pp. 162–168
- 'Louey and I' pp. 9–29
- 'Wooden Reunions' pp. 156–161
- 'The Magic Chestnuts' pp. 81–84
- 'Our Baggage-Mule' pp. 139–155
- 'In Memoriam: A Sister's Story' pp. 99–115
- 'How a Woman Kept Her Promise' pp. 68–79
- 'Tread Upon Roses, But Forget Me Not' pp. 117–136
- 'Cousin Lucy's Story' pp. 178–191
- 'Lartius' pp. 86–97
- 'Effie's Sermon' pp. 31–51
