= Birdseye Highway =

Road across Eyre Peninsula in South Australia

Birdseye Highway South Australia
- Coordinates: 33.653482°S 134.907140°E (West end); 33.679217°S 136.855050°E (East end)

General information
- Type: Highway
- Length: 198 km (123 mi)
- Route number(s): B91 (1998–present)

Major junctions
- West end: Flinders Highway; Elliston, South Australia
- Tod Highway
- East end: Lincoln Highway; Cowell, South Australia

Location(s)
- Region: Eyre Western
- Major settlements: Lock, Cleve

Highway system
- Highways in Australia; National Highway • Freeways in Australia; Highways in South Australia

Birdseye Highway is an east–west road across Eyre Peninsula in South Australia. It was named for Sylvia Birdseye who drove the first bus service to the area from Adelaide for 43 years, starting in 1928, and is the first highway in South Australia to be named for a woman.

== Route ==
Birdseye Highway connects Elliston on Flinders Highway on the west coast, through Cleve and Lock, to Cowell on the Lincoln Highway near the Spencer Gulf coast.

== Major junctions ==
LGA	Location	km	mi	Destinations	Notes
Elliston	Elliston	0	0.0	Flinders Highway (B100) – Streaky Bay, Ceduna	Western terminus of highway and route B91
Elliston	Mount Wedge	30	19	Kyancutta-Mount Wedge Road – Kyancutta	
Elliston	Lock	89	55	Tod Highway (B90) – Kyancutta, Cummins	
Cleve	Cleve	163	101	Cleve Road (north) – Kimba; Arno Bay Road (south) – Arno Bay	
Franklin Harbour	Cowell	198	123	Lincoln Highway (B100) – Cowell, Whyalla, Port Augusta	Eastern terminus of highway and route B91, 6 km west of Cowell
Route transition
