= Flinders Highway, South Australia =

Highway in South Australia

Flinders Highway South Australia
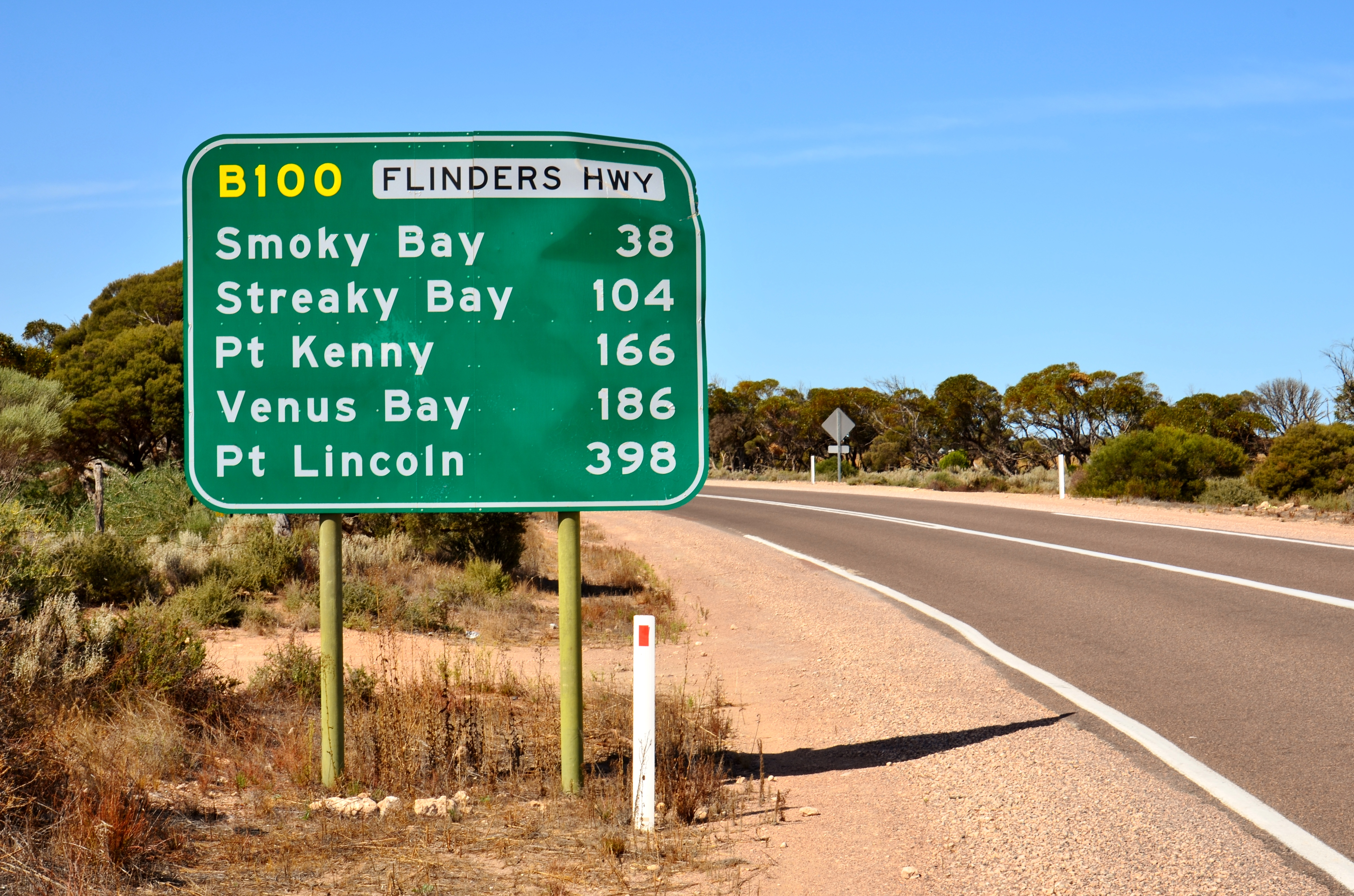
- Highway sign, Ceduna
- Coordinates: 32.126848°S 133.734659°E (Northwest end); 34.717987°S 135.853880°E (Southeast end)

General information
- Type: Highway
- Length: 396 km (246 mi)
- Route number(s): B100 (1999–present) (Ceduna–Hawson)
- Former route number: Alt National Route 1(1978–1999); Entire route

Major junctions
- Northwest end: Eyre Highway; Ceduna, South Australia
- Birdseye Highway; Tod Highway
- Southeast end: Lincoln Highway; Port Lincoln, South Australia

Location(s)
- Region: Eyre Western
- Major settlements: Smoky Bay, Streaky Bay, Port Kenny, Elliston, Mount Hope, Coffin Bay

Highway system
- Highways in Australia; National Highway • Freeways in Australia; Highways in South Australia

Flinders Highway connects the South Australian towns of Ceduna and Port Lincoln, a distance of 396 kilometres (246 mi) Flinders Highway – along with Lincoln Highway – presents an alternative but somewhat longer coastal route between Ceduna and Port Augusta, compared to the more direct route along Eyre Highway. It is designated route B100.

== Route ==
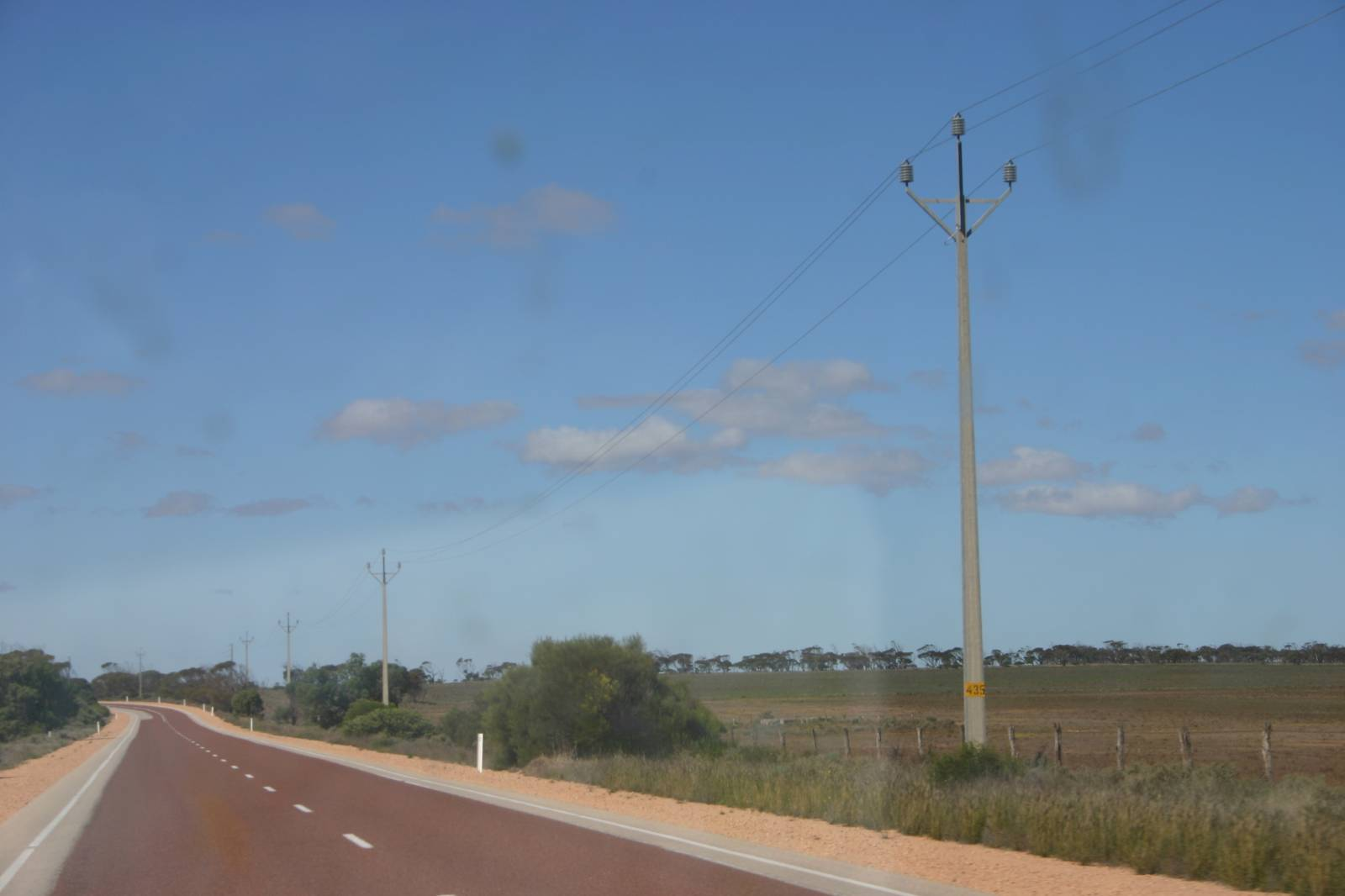
Stobie poles beside the Flinders Highway

Flinders Highway runs parallel to the western coast of the Eyre Peninsula through undulating farmland. It is named after the explorer Matthew Flinders who sighted these coasts in early 1802 from HMS Investigator. Only small settlements lie along its track: of these, Coffin Bay is a centre for oyster farming, Elliston is renowned for swimming beaches and fishing and Ceduna is the main town on the far west coast of South Australia supporting government offices and businesses.

== History ==
The South Australian government decreed "the road from Port Lincoln to Streaky Bay will be known as the Flinders Highway", taking effect on 1 July 1938.

== Major junctions ==
LGA	Location	km	mi	Destinations	Notes
Ceduna	Ceduna	0	0.0	Eyre Highway (A1) – Ceduna, Kyancutta	6km east of Ceduna, northwestern terminus of highway and route B100
Streaky Bay	Streaky Bay	96	60	Streaky Bay Road – Poochera	8km northeast of Streaky Bay
Elliston	Elliston	231	144	Birdseye Highway (B91) – Lock	2km southeast of Elliston
Lower Eyre Peninsula	Wangary	366	227	Coffin Bay Road – Coffin Bay	12km east of Wangary township
Lower Eyre Peninsula	Pearlah	374	232	Tod Highway (B90) – Cummins, Lock	
Lower Eyre Peninsula	Hawson	386	240	Western Approach Road (B100) – Port Lincoln	Route B100 continues southeast along Western Approach Road
Lower Eyre Peninsula	Port Lincoln	396	246	Lincoln Highway (B100) – Whyalla, Port Augusta	Southeastern terminus of Flinders Highway, route B100 heads northeast along Lincoln Highway
Route transition

== See also ==
- Highways in Australia
- List of highways in South Australia
