= Hundred of Colton (South Australia) =

The Hundred of Colton is a cadastral unit of hundred in the County of Musgrave, South Australia on the Eyre Peninsula. It was proclaimed on 22 June 1876 and covers an area of 370 square kilometres (141 sq mi). The hundred was named after John Colton, a former member of the South Australian Parliament.
