= Alice Hambidge =

Australian artist (1869–1947)

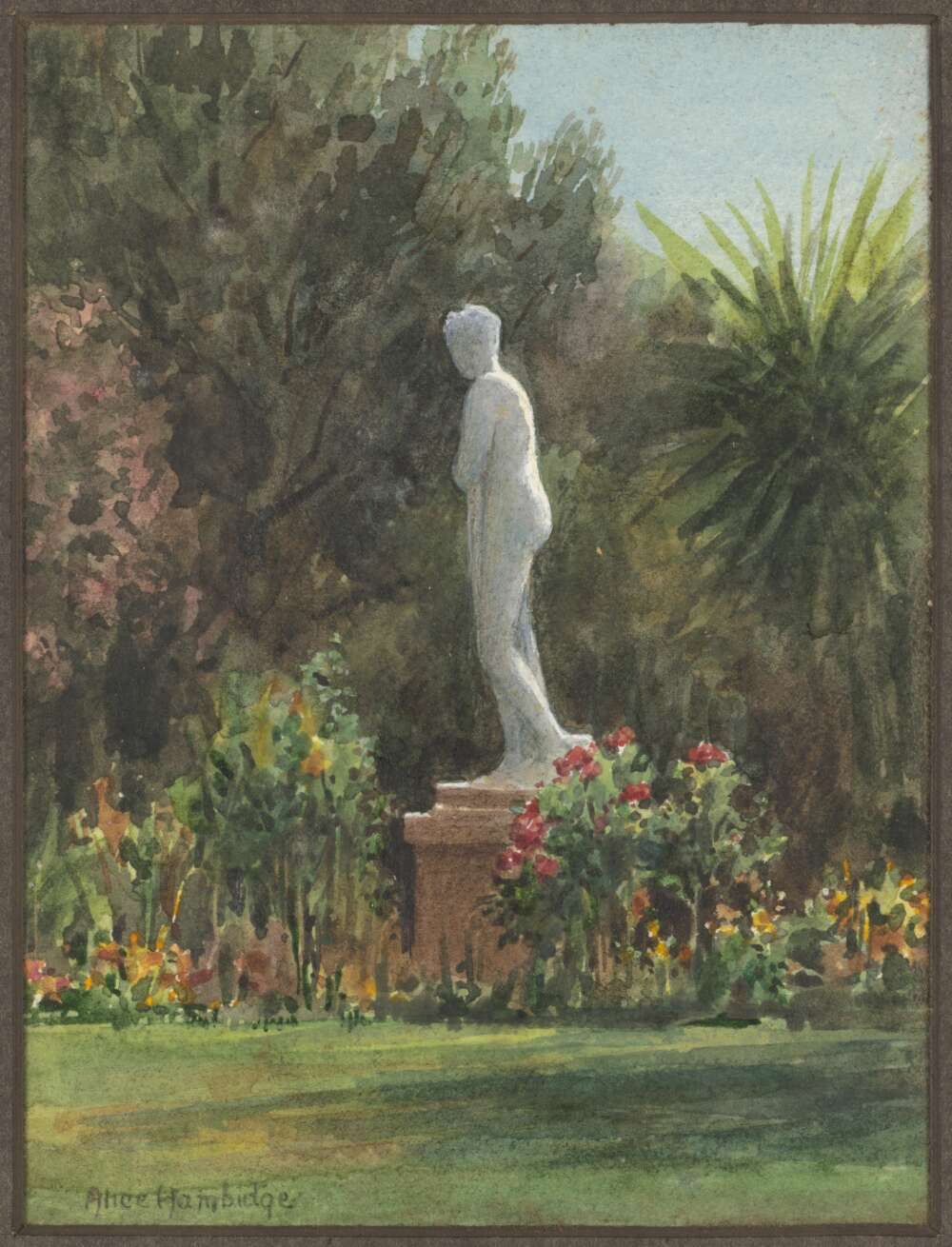
Statue of Venus, North Terrace, Adelaide by Alice Hambidge, c.1909

Alice Marian Hambidge (2 October 1869 – 20 January 1947) was an Australian artist.

Born in Kensington, South Australia on 2 October 1869, Hambidge received art training at the School of Design in Adelaide in 1893. Her sisters Helen and Millicent were also artists.

Her work is included in the collections of the Art Gallery of South Australia, the Art Gallery of New South Wales and the National Library of Australia.

Hambidge Crescent in the Canberra suburb of Chisholm is named in honour of her and her sisters.
