= Hambidge Center Historic District =

Historic district in Georgia, United States

- U.S. National Register of Historic Places
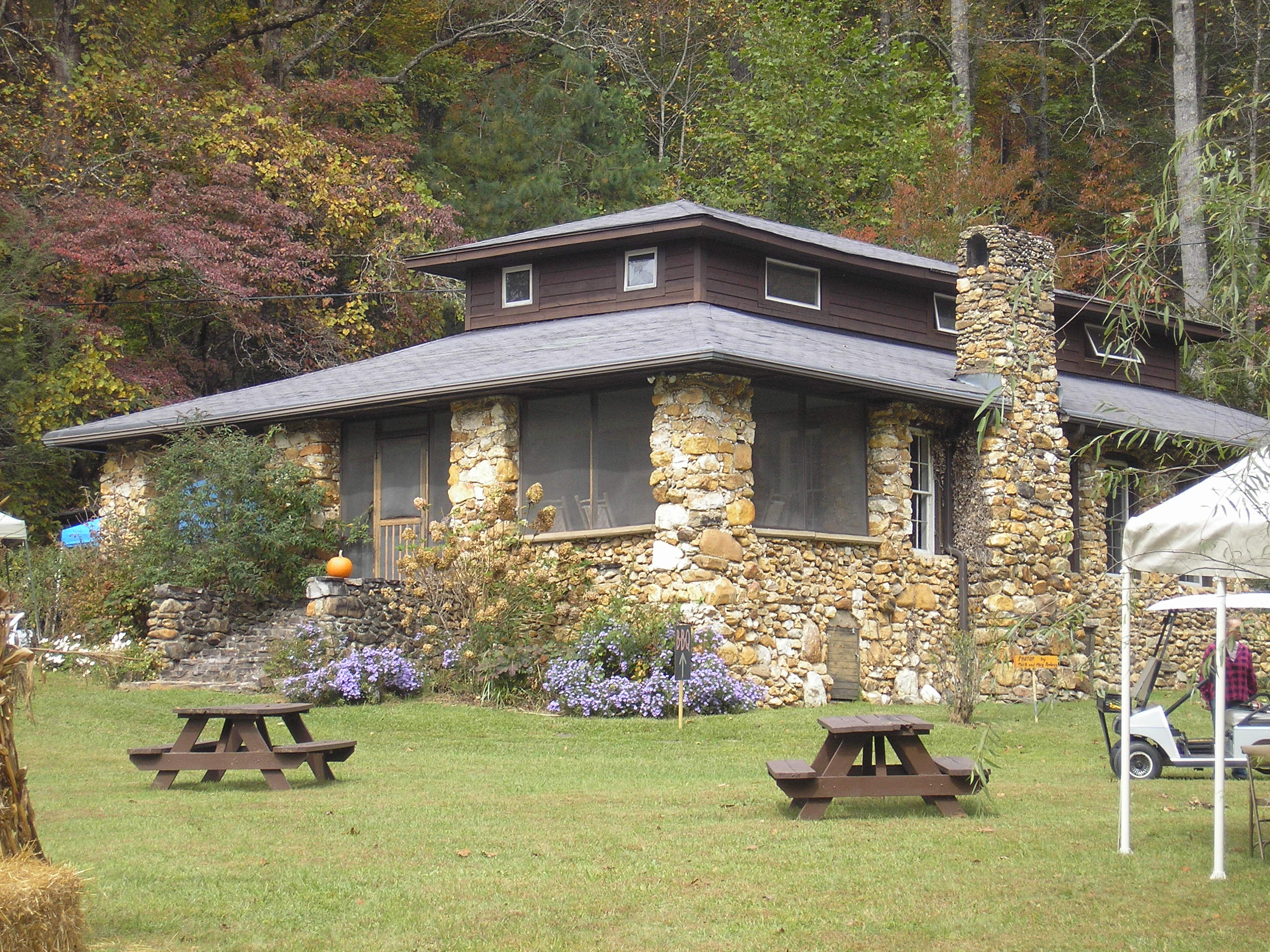

- Location within Georgia
- Nearest city: Dillard, Georgia
- Coordinates: 34°59′13″N 83°26′19″W
- Area: 660 acres (2.7 km^{2})
- Built by: Multiple
- NRHP reference No.: 82000146
- Added to NRHP: October 5, 1982

The Hambidge Center Historic District is a 660 acres (2.7 km^{2}) historic district near the community of Dillard in Rabun County, Georgia, United States.

Located west of Dillard on Betty's Creek Rd., Hambidge Center was listed on the National Register of Historic Places in 1982. The district comprises 25 separate contributing properties, including a log cabin dating to the 1830s.
