= Hincks Wilderness Protection Area =

Protected area in South Australia

- IUCN category Ib (wilderness area)
- Location within South Australia
- Location: South Australia
- Nearest city: Lock
- Coordinates: 33°52′17″S 136°1′4.9″E
- Area: 66.658 km^{2} (25.737 sq mi)
- Established: 30 September 2004
- Governing body: Department for Environment and Water

Hincks Wilderness Protection Area is a protected area in the Australian state of South Australia located in the gazetted locality of Hincks about 87 kilometres (54 miles) north of Port Lincoln and 35 kilometres (22 miles) south east of Lock on the Eyre Peninsula. The wilderness protection area was proclaimed under the Wilderness Protection Act 1992 on 30 September 2004 on land excised from the Hincks Conservation Park.

The following qualities have been identified by the government agency managing the wilderness protection area:

Originally set aside as a flora and fauna reserve in 1941, it is one of the largest expanses of mallee on Eyre Peninsula. The area has recorded 420 species of vascular plants including 28 orchids. Of the 420 species, 91 (including four species of orchid) had not previously been recorded on any other reserve in South Australia. The wilderness protection area is dominated by Mallee, with a small portion covered by forest, woodland, or shrubland. Visitors occasionally travel through the reserve or camp on the North-South Track.

It is classified as an IUCN Category Ib protected area.

== See also ==
- Protected areas of South Australia
