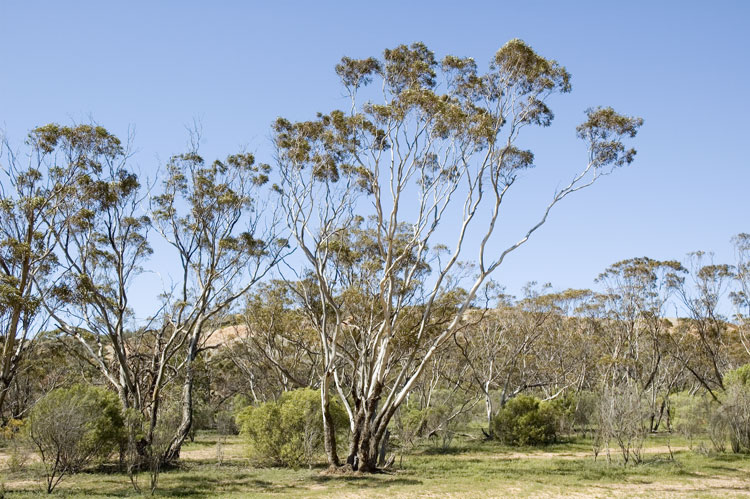
- Eucalyptus porosa on Mount Wudinna, Eyre Peninsula

Conservation status
- Vulnerable (IUCN 3.1)

Scientific classification
- Kingdom: Plantae
- Clade: Tracheophytes
- Clade: Angiosperms
- Clade: Eudicots
- Clade: Rosids
- Order: Myrtales
- Family: Myrtaceae
- Genus: Eucalyptus
- Species: E. porosa

Binomial name
- Eucalyptus porosa F.Muell. ex Miq.

= Eucalyptus porosa =

Mallee box

Species of eucalyptus

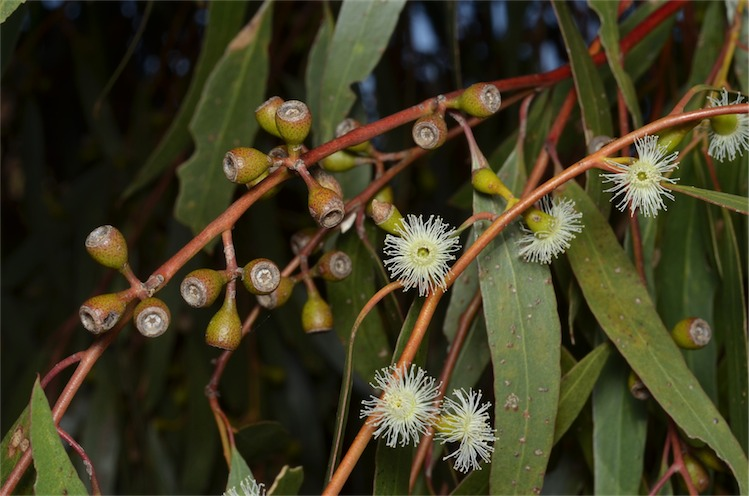
Flower buds, flowers and fruit

Eucalyptus porosa, commonly known as mallee box, Quorn mallee or water mallee, is a species of mallee or a tree that is endemic to southern Australia. It has rough, fibrous or flaky bark on the trunk and larger branches, smooth greyish bark above, lance-shaped adult leaves, flower buds in groups of seven, white flowers and barrel-shaped or shortened spherical fruit.

== Description ==
Eucalyptus porosa is a mallee that typically grows to a height of 5 m (16 ft), or a tree to 12–14 m (39–46 ft), and forms a lignotuber. It has rough, fibrous or flaky, greyish bark on the trunk or stems, smooth whitish or grey bark above. Young plant and coppice regrowth have egg-shaped to lance-shaped leaves that are 55–90 mm (2.2–3.5 in) long and 12–22 mm (0.47–0.87 in) wide. Adult leaves are the same shade of glossy green on both sides, lance-shaped, 50–120 mm (2.0–4.7 in) long and 8–23 mm (0.31–0.91 in) wide, tapering to a petiole 5–18 mm (0.20–0.71 in) long. The flower buds are arranged in leaf axils in groups of seven on an unbranched peduncle 2–12 mm (0.079–0.472 in) long, the individual buds on pedicels up to 7 mm (0.28 in) long. Mature buds are oval, 4–7 mm (0.16–0.28 in) long and 3–4 mm (0.12–0.16 in) wide with a conical to rounded or slightly beaked operculum. Flowering mainly occurs between October and March and the flowers are white. The fruit is a woody, barrel-shaped or shortened spherical capsule 4–7 mm (0.16–0.28 in) long and 4–8 mm (0.16–0.31 in) wide with the valves near rim level.

== Taxonomy and naming ==
Eucalyptus porosa was first formally described in 1856 by Friedrich Miquel from an unpublished description by Ferdinand von Mueller. Miquel's description was published in the journal Nederlandsch Kruidkundig Archief. The specific epithet (porosa) is from the Latin porosus meaning "pierced with small holes", referring to small holes in the anthers.

== Distribution and habitat ==
Mallee box is widely distributed in the semi-arid regions of South Australia, north-western Victoria and south-western New South Wales. It grows in a variety of habitats including rocky ridges, coastal limestone, mallee shrubland and woodland.

== See also ==
- List of Eucalyptus species
