= Tod Highway =

Highway in South Australia

Tod Highway South Australia
- Coordinates: 33.137°S 135.556°E (North end); 34.62°S 135.67°E (South end)

General information
- Type: Highway
- Length: 176 km (109 mi)
- Route number(s): B90 (1998–present)

Major junctions
- North end: Eyre Highway; Kyancutta, South Australia
- Birdseye Highway
- South end: Flinders Highway; Uley, South Australia

Location(s)
- Region: Eyre Western
- Major settlements: Warramboo, Lock, Karkoo, Yeelanna, Cummins, Edillilie, Wanilla

Highway system
- Highways in Australia; National Highway • Freeways in Australia; Highways in South Australia

Tod Highway is an important 177 kilometre highway serving South Australia's Eyre Peninsula's wheatbelt, and is designated route B90. It is named after Robert Tod who explored the area in 1839.

== Route ==
Tod Highway begins from Eyre Highway at Kyancutta and runs directly south, through Lock and Cummins to Flinders Highway, 25km west of Port Lincoln, practically dividing the Eyre Peninsula right down the middle into eastern and western halves. The highway passes through wheat, barley, wool and livestock farms, and provides access to grain terminals in Port Lincoln.

== Major intersections ==
LGA	Location	km	mi	Destinations	Notes
Wudinna	Kyancutta	0	0.0	Eyre Highway (A1) – Ceduna, Port Augusta	Northern terminus of highway and route B90
Elliston	Lock	54	34	Birdseye Highway (B91) – Elliston, Cleve, Cowell	
Lower Eyre Peninsula	Cummins	135	84	Bratten Way – Tumby Bay, Mount Hope	
Lower Eyre Peninsula	Pearlah	176	109	Flinders Highway (B100) – Port Lincoln, Coffin Bay	Southern terminus of highway and route B90
Route transition

== See also ==
- Tod Reservoir
