= District Council of Elliston =

Coordinates: 33.65°S 134.883333°E

- Local government area
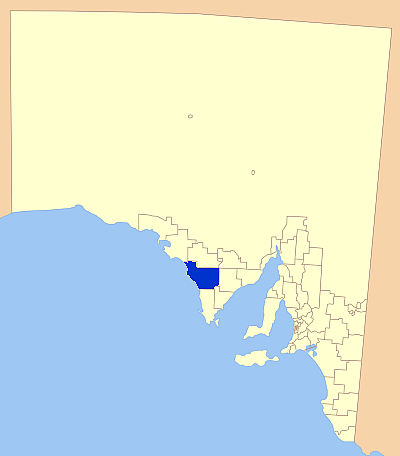
- Location of the District Council of Elliston

- Interactive map of District Council of Elliston
- Country: Australia
- State: South Australia
- Region: Eyre Western
- Established: 1888
- Council seat: Elliston

Government
  - Mayor: Andrew McLeod
  - State electorate: Flinders
  - Federal division: Grey

Area
  - Total: 6,500 km^{2} (2,500 sq mi)

Population
  - Total: 1,014 (LGA 2021)
- Website: District Council of Elliston
LGAs around District Council of Elliston
Streaky Bay	Wudinna	Kimba
Southern Ocean	District Council of Elliston	Cleve
Southern Ocean	Lower Eyre Peninsula	Tumby Bay

The District Council of Elliston is a local government area covering around 6500 km^{2} on the Western Eyre Peninsula in South Australia. Established in 1888, the district has a diverse economy, with agriculture, commercial fishing and tourism making up the majority of the local economy.

== History ==
The council was established by the District Councils Act 1887 on 5 January 1888. The bounds were defined in the act as "Comprising the whole of the County of Musgrave, and portion of the County of Robinson south of a true east line from the most northern point of Venus Bay to the east boundary of the said county." This meant that the lands defined as the Hundred of Downer, Hundred of Wallis, most of the Hundred of Wright and an unincorporated area approximately 100 square miles between the three (proposed to be Hundred of McBeath but never gazetted) outside Musgrave county were included in the north west of the council area.

== Localities ==
The district encompasses the main towns of Elliston, Lock, Port Kenny and Venus Bay, as well as a number of smaller towns and localities, including Bramfield, Colton, Coolillie, Kappawanta, Mount Joy, Mount Wedge, Murdinga, Palkagee, Polda, Sheringa, Talia, Tooligie and Ulyerra, and part of Hambidge and Mount Damper.

== Economy ==
The district's economy relies on a combination of agriculture and seafood harvesting. Cereal crops and sheep are the main focuses of farming, with abalone and crayfish being important to professional fishermen.

The district has two health facilities; A hospital at Elliston and a medical centre located in Lock. Three schools exist in the district, as well as a community library in Lock. As with most districts on the Eyre Peninsula, there are a variety of sporting clubs and a number of jetties for recreational fishermen.

== Council ==
Ward	Councillor	Notes
Unsubdivided
Unsubdivided	Andrew McLeod	Mayor
Unsubdivided	Allison Pickford	Deputy Mayor
Unsubdivided	Malcolm Hancock	
Unsubdivided	Tony Custance	
Unsubdivided	Andrew Polkinghorne	
Unsubdivided	Ashley Traeger	
Unsubdivided	Fiona Matthews	
Unsubdivided	Michael Zerk	

== Meetings ==
The Meetings of Council are held on the third Tuesday of each month. Meetings commence at 9.00am and include a ten-minute question time which is open to the public.
