= Lock, South Australia =

Lock
- Town
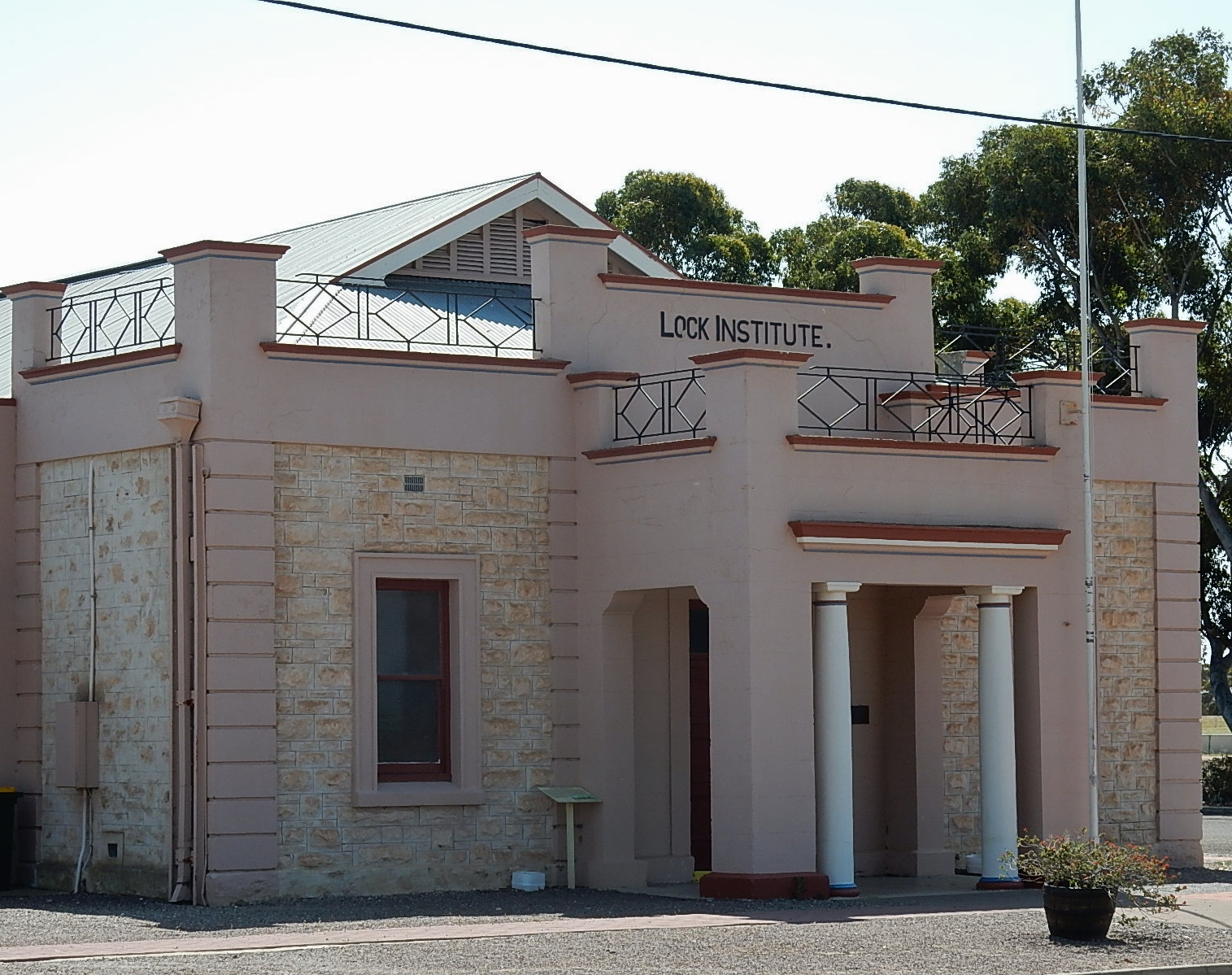
- Lock Institute

- Interactive map of Lock
- Coordinates: 33°34′S 135°46′E
- Country: Australia
- State: South Australia
- LGA: District Council of Elliston
- Location: 606 km (377 mi) West of Adelaide; 146 km (91 mi) N of Port Lincoln
- Established: 1918

Government
  - State electorate: Flinders
  - Federal division: Grey
- Elevation: 123 m (404 ft)

Population
  - Total: 253 (SAL 2021)
- Postcode: 5633
- Mean max temp: 23.1 °C (73.6 °F)
- Mean min temp: 9.2 °C (48.6 °F)
- Annual rainfall: 401.3 mm (15.80 in)
Localities around Lock
Palkagee	Ulyerra	Hambidge
Polda	Lock	Boonerdo
Kappawanta	Murdinga	Murlong

Lock is a town in the centre of Eyre Peninsula in South Australia. It is central Eyre Peninsula's main grain storage hub, as it is surrounded by a predominantly farming community, with emphasis on cereal crop production. The town has a hotel, caravan park, motel, supermarket, post office, police station, library, sporting complex, golf and bowling clubs and area school. At the 2006 census, Lock had a population of 290.

== History ==
Although many nearby coastal towns were settled much earlier, Lock was not established until the 1860s due to the low rainfall and marginal conditions. Early settlers grazed sheep on vast tracts of natural vegetation for very low costs. Land settlement occurred in 1861, with settlements continuing further north over the next decades.

A major change occurred in the area with the arrival of the Port Lincoln railway line in 1913. The area was serviced by a siding known simply as Terre Siding after one of the local properties. This was altered when the town was gazetted in February 1918, and named Lock after Sergeant Albert Ernest Lock, a member of the South Australian Survey Department who had been killed in Belgium during World War I, in 1917.

The potential for wheat cropping was realised with the establishment of the railway, but the low rainfall kept any developments from happening until the pipeline from the Tod Reservoir was connected. Two years later, a huge underground water reservoir was discovered under the town, capable of supplying all of the town's water needs.

The Lock Heritage Museum displays a number of old wartime, farming and household items used in the area many years ago.

== Geography ==
The town is located in the geographic centre of the Eyre Peninsula, surrounded by mostly flat farming land, with patches of remnant vegetation. It is at the intersection of the central highways, the Tod Highway from the base to the point of the peninsula and the Birdseye Highway across the middle.

It is also located close to the Hambidge Wilderness Protection Area to the north and the Hincks Conservation Park and the Hincks Wilderness Protection Area to the south, where the area's original ecosystems are somewhat preserved.

== Community ==
In the 2006 Australian Bureau of Statistics Census of Population and Housing, the population of the Lock town census area was 290. Some 95.2% of the population was born in Australia, with immigrants coming from New Zealand, United States of America and England.

== Economy ==
Agriculture, predominantly cereal cropping and to a lesser extent, sheep grazing, is still the area's main economic input, with a minor input from tourism during school holidays.

Mining potential in the area is showing promise, with iron ore having been discovered in banded iron formations only 20 km to the southeast at Wilgerup by Centrex Metals.

Iron Road is also proposing to mine magnetite north of Lock.
