= Elliston, South Australia =

Elliston
- Town
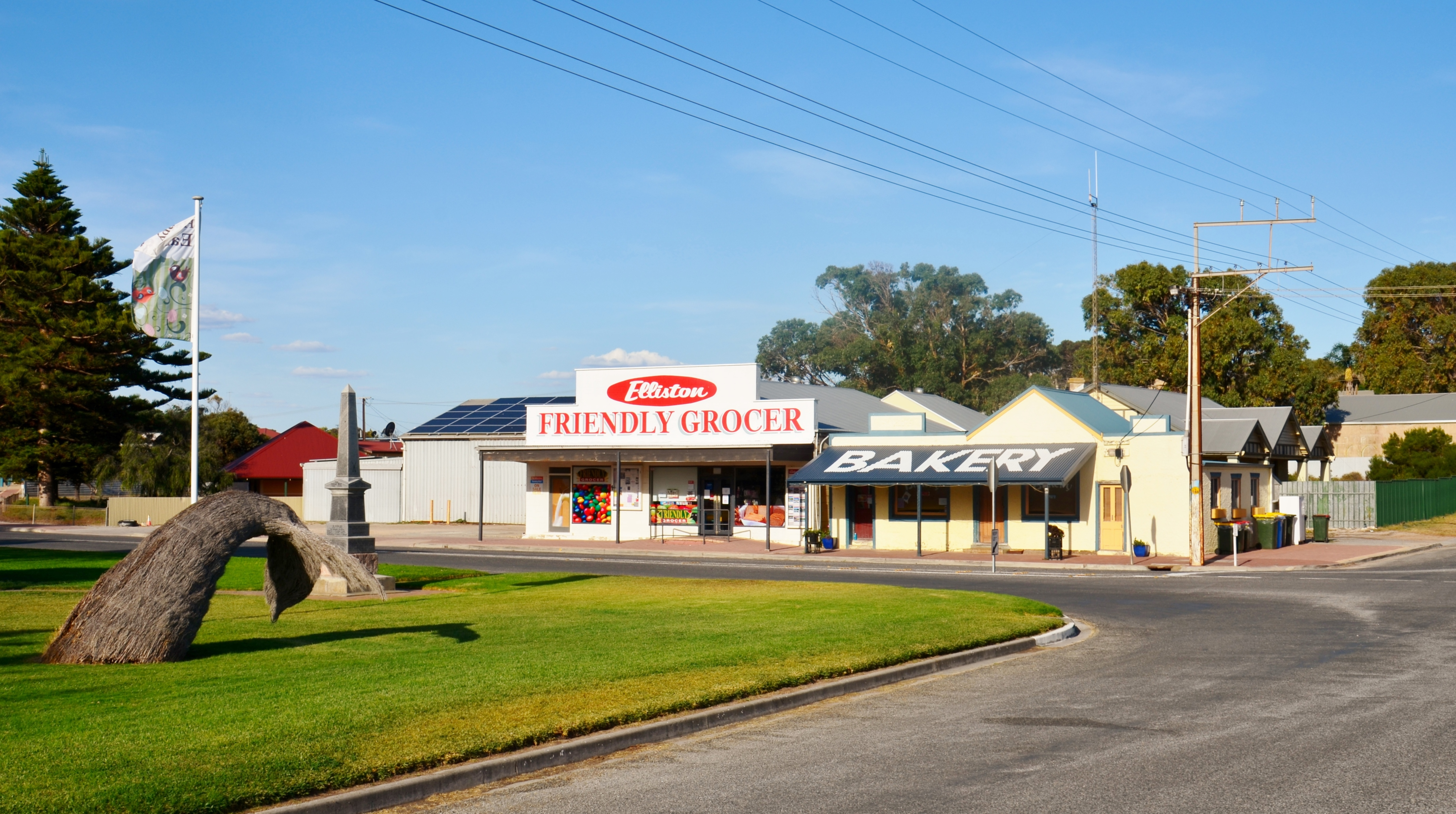
- The town centre

- Coordinates: 33°39′0″S 134°53′0″E
- Country: Australia
- State: South Australia
- LGA: District Council of Elliston
- Location: 641 km (398 mi) W of Adelaide
- Established: 1878

Government
  - State electorate: Flinders
  - Federal division: Grey
- Elevation: 16 m (52 ft)

Population
  - Total: 333 (UCL 2021)
- Postcode: 5670
- Mean max temp: 21.3 °C (70.3 °F)
- Mean min temp: 11.7 °C (53.1 °F)
- Annual rainfall: 425.9 mm (16.77 in)
Localities around Elliston
Ocean	Colton	Mount Joy
Ocean	Elliston	Mount Joy; Bramfield
Ocean	Ocean	Ocean

Elliston is a small coastal town in the Australian state of South Australia on the west coast of Eyre Peninsula, 169 km northwest of Port Lincoln and 641 km west of Adelaide. The township is located on Waterloo Bay. At the 2021 census, Elliston had a population of 333.

== History ==
The first inhabitants of the land that is now Elliston were the Nauo.

The first recorded exploration of the adjacent coastline was by Matthew Flinders in the vessel HMS Investigator from 10–13 February 1802. He named the offshore islands but did not note the presence of Waterloo Bay in his log.

Edward John Eyre explored the area on land in 1840 and 1841 on a journey to Western Australia from Port Lincoln. Originally named Waterloo Bay, the township was later named by Governor Sir William Jervois on a plan for the town on 23 November 1878. It is named after the writer and educator Ellen Liston who was born in London in 1838 and emigrated to South Australia in 1850. She was a governess working on a local property (Nilkerloo) owned by John Hamp.

Those dismissive of women's contributions to history have suggested that Jervois, who had a military background, chose to honour Sir Henry Walton Ellis (1783–1815) who was a hero of the Battle of Waterloo during which campaign he died of his wounds. However it is recorded that Jervois liked naming places after people he knew and the town was gazetted formally as Elliston in 1878 after being informally called Ellie's Town. The Sydney Morning Herald write of the town's naming after Ellen Liston:

"The honour was a combination of the wide spread respect and admiration she enjoyed in the area and Jervois' penchant for naming towns after friends and family."

The area was settled in the 1840s with Elliston being the central port from which the early settlers transported their wool and wheat to market. Sailing ships and later steam ships crossed Waterloo Bay's notorious reefed entrance. A number of ships foundered in the bay due to its narrow entrance and variable tides.

The Nauo people were hit extremely hard by the effects of European settlement. There was a very great deal of violence against Aboriginal people in this area (and a good deal of violence against white settlers also). The Waterloo Bay Massacre of 1869 (also known as the Elliston Massacre) occurred close to Elliston, and there are also many better-documented murders and other violent acts towards Aboriginal people in this area.

== Geography ==
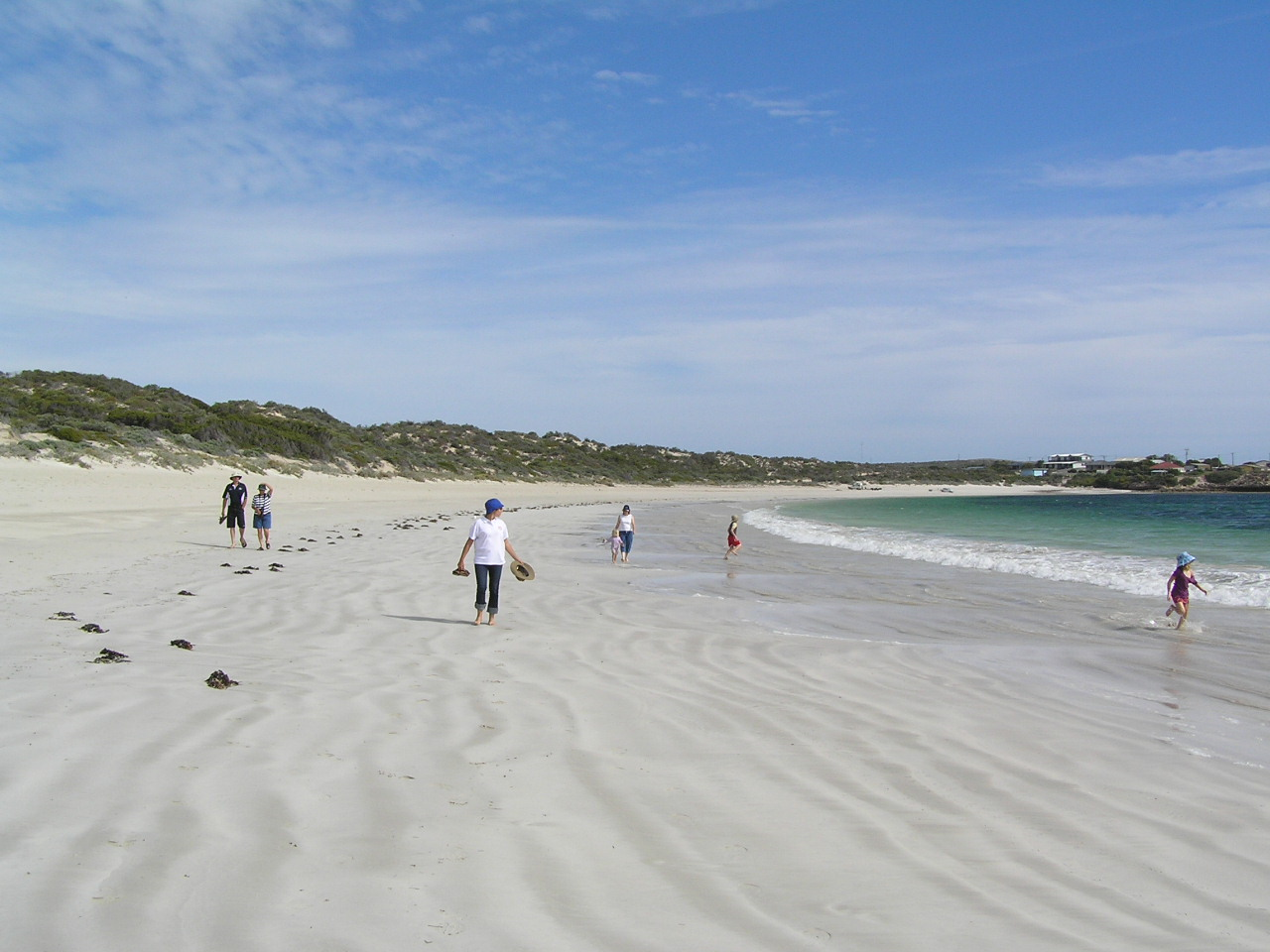
Elliston Beach

The town of Elliston lies on Waterloo Bay, a small coastal inlet which is partially protected by a number of reefs lining the entrance to the bay. Outside of the bay, the coastline is exclusively large cliffs, with a number of surf beaches located on these stretches.

Inside the bay, it is relatively calm and shallow, with seagrass beds and reefs underwater, and sandy beaches lining most of the bay. Inland, the country is mostly flat agricultural land. The southern end of the Lake Newland Conservation Park lies about 10 km to the north of the town.

Offshore, Flinders Island is 32 kilometres (20 mi) west south west of Wellington Point at Elliston.

=== Climate ===
Elliston experiences a warm-summer mediterranean climate (Köppen: Csb); with warm, dry summers and mild, wetter winters. Breezes from the Southern Ocean moderate summer temperatures (with average maxima and minima reaching 26.0 °C (78.8 °F) in January and 15.9 °C (60.6 °F) in February); but on occasion, northerly breezes from the Outback produce heatwaves: with maxima exceeding 40.0 °C (104.0 °F). Winter temperatures are more consistent: bottoming at 7.1 to 16.5 °C (44.8 to 61.7 °F) in July. Annual precipitation is somewhat low: averaging 425.9 mm (16.77 in), between 105.5 precipitation days- primarily concentrated in frequent winter showers. While 193.5 mm (7.62 in) of precipitation was recorded in June 1956, only 183.6 mm (7.23 in) was measured in 1959. Extreme temperatures have ranged from 44.3 °C (111.7 °F) on the 23rd of January 2019 to −1.0 °C (30.2 °F) on the 27th of September 1994.

Climate data for Elliston, elevation 7 m (23 ft), (1991–2020 normals and extremes 1962–present)
Month	Jan	Feb	Mar	Apr	May	Jun	Jul	Aug	Sep	Oct	Nov	Dec	Year
Record high °C (°F)	44.3 (111.7)	43.5 (110.3)	42.2 (108.0)	39.1 (102.4)	33.0 (91.4)	28.6 (83.5)	30.0 (86.0)	29.5 (85.1)	35.4 (95.7)	42.3 (108.1)	44.0 (111.2)	43.5 (110.3)	44.3 (111.7)
Mean daily maximum °C (°F)	26.4 (79.5)	26.0 (78.8)	24.6 (76.3)	22.8 (73.0)	19.8 (67.6)	17.4 (63.3)	16.9 (62.4)	17.8 (64.0)	20.0 (68.0)	22.4 (72.3)	24.1 (75.4)	25.4 (77.7)	22.0 (71.5)
Mean daily minimum °C (°F)	16.1 (61.0)	16.2 (61.2)	14.4 (57.9)	12.2 (54.0)	10.4 (50.7)	8.5 (47.3)	7.9 (46.2)	8.4 (47.1)	9.8 (49.6)	11.5 (52.7)	13.3 (55.9)	14.9 (58.8)	12.0 (53.5)
Record low °C (°F)	5.7 (42.3)	6.4 (43.5)	4.0 (39.2)	1.6 (34.9)	0.0 (32.0)	−0.8 (30.6)	−0.2 (31.6)	−0.6 (30.9)	−1.0 (30.2)	2.2 (36.0)	4.2 (39.6)	4.8 (40.6)	−1.0 (30.2)
Average precipitation mm (inches)	15.7 (0.62)	14.3 (0.56)	15.5 (0.61)	21.5 (0.85)	45.7 (1.80)	63.3 (2.49)	63.2 (2.49)	53.6 (2.11)	40.6 (1.60)	30.2 (1.19)	18.1 (0.71)	20.3 (0.80)	402.9 (15.86)
Average precipitation days (≥ 0.2 mm)	4.5	3.4	5.4	7.7	12.2	15.2	16.4	15.2	11.5	8.5	6.8	6.4	113.2
Average afternoon relative humidity (%)	59	61	61	61	65	66	66	64	62	58	58	59	62
Average dew point °C (°F)	14.8 (58.6)	15.3 (59.5)	13.8 (56.8)	12.4 (54.3)	11.4 (52.5)	9.8 (49.6)	9.1 (48.4)	9.1 (48.4)	10.1 (50.2)	10.7 (51.3)	12.3 (54.1)	13.5 (56.3)	11.9 (53.3)
Source: Bureau of Meteorology (humidity 1991-2010 normals)

== Economy ==
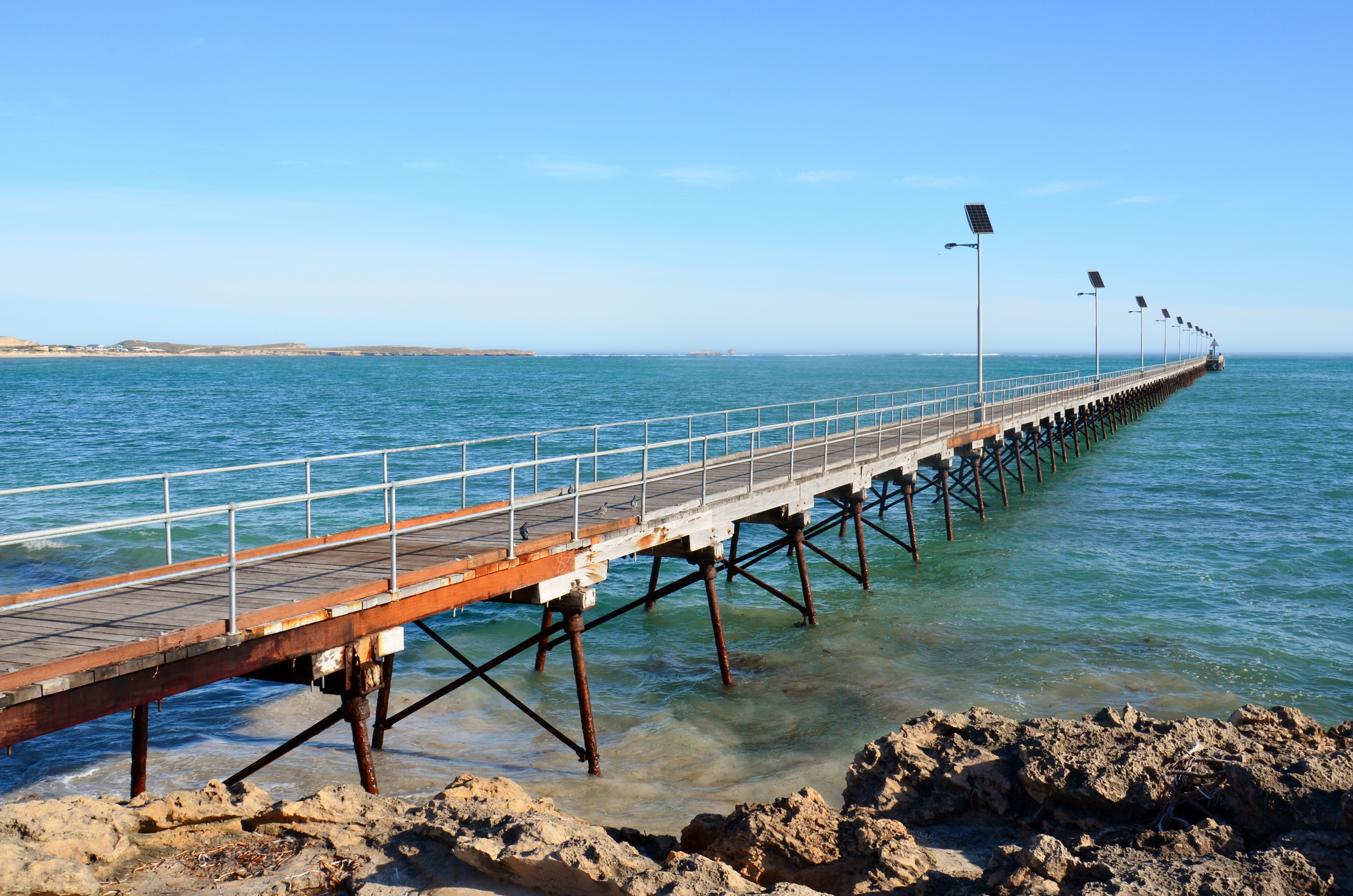
Elliston Jetty

Agriculture, fishing and tourism make up Elliston's economy. Barley and wheat farming take place alongside sheep grazing on the adjacent farmland. Marine activities include abalone diving, lobster and scale fisheries.

The area is a tourist destination, the town having two caravan parks as well as motel and hotel accommodation. Fishing, swimming and other water based activities are common in the protected bay.

Surfing is possible at stretches along the coast, but high numbers of sharks make it risky. Many surf beaches are known for catches of salmon, mulloway and shark as well, with Lock's Well one of the more established beaches.

== Community ==
The town has a number of sporting clubs and facilities, as well as churches, a hotel, and many local businesses, such as a bakery, a hair salon, and more.

Former Port Adelaide Power footballer Cameron Hitchcock is from Elliston.

=== Historic buildings ===
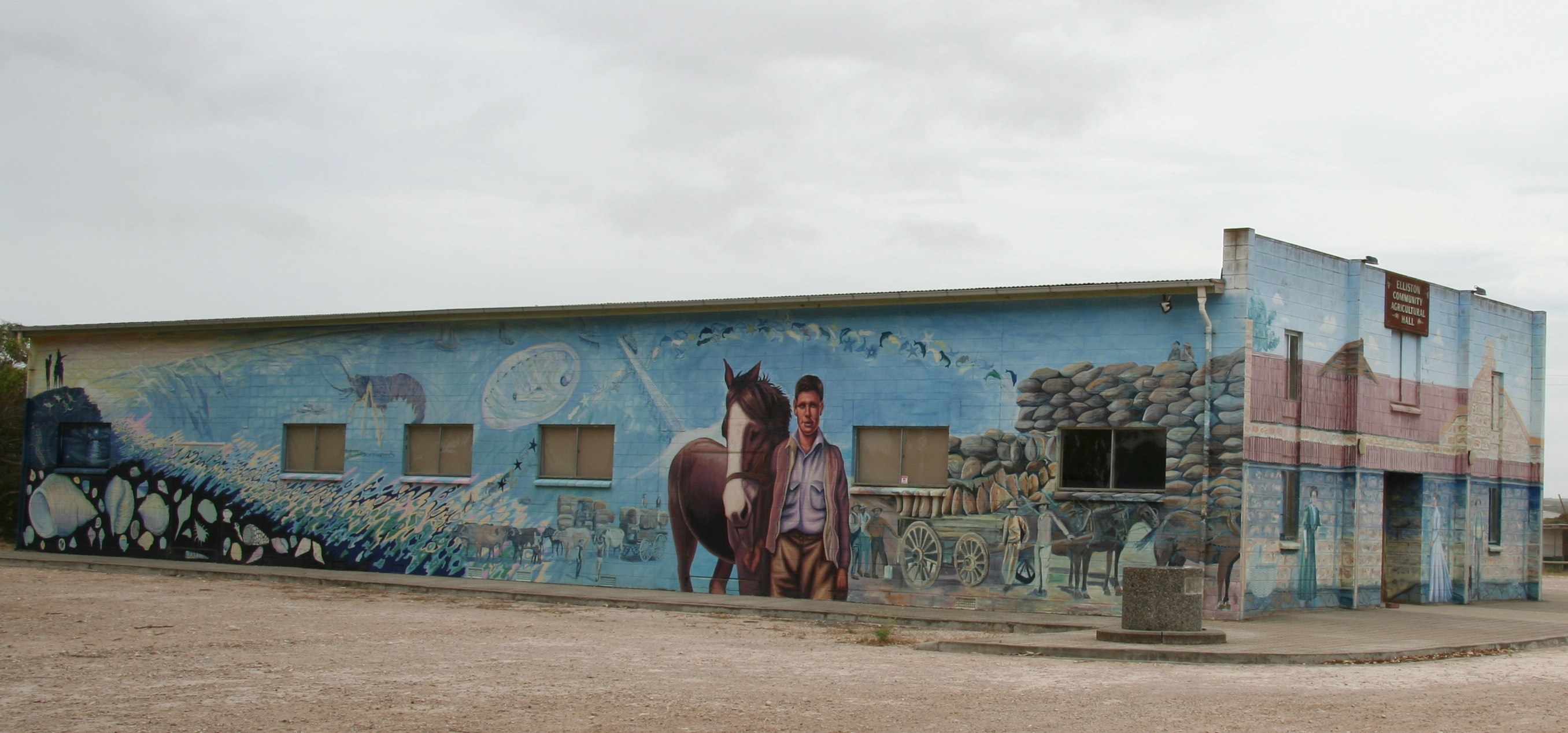
Hall Mural

The hall, which was officially opened on 10 February 1968, is distinguished by its mural which was painted with the help of local community members under the direction of artists Siv Grava and John Turpie. According to the placard erected by the District Council of Elliston, it is the largest mural of its type in Australia, depicts the historical life of Elliston and covers more than 500 square metres.

The first District Council of Elliston Council Chambers were built in 1913 and still stand adjacent to Waterloo Bay Caravan Park.

The Country Women's Association Rooms were the first to be built in South Australia by that organisation and opened on 4 July 1936.

The Post Office was opened on 13 August 1880 and is the oldest public building still in use. The first Police Station (which still stands) was opened in 1881 and continued to be in use until 1971.

=== Heritage listings ===
Elliston has a number of heritage-listed sites, including:

- Flinders Highway: Oaklands Shearing Shed
- off Flinders Highway: Elliston Cast Iron Lead Light
- off Flinders Highway: Elliston Jetty
- 9 Memorial Drive: Elliston Country Women's Association Rest Rooms

== See also ==
- Elliston (disambiguation)
