= Cape Hardy =

- Coordinates: 34°10′43″S 136°19′14″E
- Country: Australia
- State: South Australia
- LGA: District Council of Tumby Bay
- Location: 215 km (134 mi) WNW of Adelaide

Government
  - State electorate: Flinders
  - Federal division: Grey
- Elevation: 20 m (66 ft)
- Postcode: 5604
Localities around Cape Hardy
Mount Hill	Port Neill	Spencer Gulf
Ungarra	Cape Hardy	Spencer Gulf
Sheep Hill	Lipson Cove	Spencer Gulf

Cape Hardy is a 20 m (66 ft) high, dune-capped granite headland on the eastern coast of Eyre Peninsula and which protrudes into Spencer Gulf in South Australia. It is located between the towns of Port Neill and Tumby Bay, 10 km (6.2 mi) north-northeast of Lipson Cove.

== Geography and geology ==
The cape is generally barren of vegetation other than low scrub. To the north and south of the cape are a series of low headland-bound white sandy beaches, backed by low dunes and farmland. Public access is limited to the Cape Hardy track and there are currently no facilities present. The surrounding beaches tend to face east to southeast and usually receive low swell and wind waves less than 1 m (3 ft 3 in) high.

== Early history ==
Cape Hardy is named after surveyor Alfred Hardy (1813–1870).

The first European to explore this coastline, in 1802, was the British navigator Matthew Flinders, but, although he named many features, he did not name this cape. Later in 1802 the French navigator Nicolas Baudin also sailed past, giving it the name Cap Portalis, honouring the French jurist Jean-Étienne-Marie Portalis, but that name was not used.

The first land-based exploration by Europeans was in April 1840, at which time the cape was named after Alfred Hardy, then being the aide-de-camp to Governor George Gawler. Gawler was leading an expedition along this coast accompanied by explorer John Hill and Deputy Surveyor General Thomas Burr. The vice-regal party was supported at sea by the brig Porter and the government cutter Water Witch, both under the command of Thomas Lipson.

== Pastoralism, farming, and fishing ==
In 1898, A. Poynton and William Tennant Mortlock, the members for the South Australian electorate of Flinders presented a petition to the Commissioner of Crown Lands (Hon. L. O'Loughlin) requesting the consideration of the establishment of a dog fence running west across Eyre Peninsula from Cape Hardy to Mount Misery. The petition was drafted in response to pastoralists' struggles to manage vermin in the Lower Eyre Peninsula region.

In April 1932, a piece of flotsam believed to be a hatch-cover from the missing ketch Vivid was found near Cape Hardy by Captain E. S. Hipkins of the ketch Nelcebee. Vivid was last seen departing Tumby Bay on 9 April 1932. As of 2014, the ship's fate and that of its crew remain a mystery.

== Proposed export port ==
In December 2012, Cape Hardy was announced as the location for a prospective deep water port development. The port is planned to serve the export interests of mining company Iron Road and the development of the Central Eyre Iron Project. It received Major Project Status from the Government of South Australia in August 2013. In November 2015, Iron Road announced that an Environmental Impact Statement and Mining Lease application had been lodged with the South Australian Department of Planning, Transport and Infrastructure, which includes the port proposal.

As of 2018, the project has received environmental and planning approval but construction is yet to commence. Iron Road remains committed to the project.

=== Alternatives ===
Another prospective iron ore mining company, Centrex Metals, proposed to construct an alternative port known as Port Spencer. Its site was located 9 km southwest of Cape Hardy, adjacent to Lipson Cove. That proposal was sunk in 2016, with this site being sold in 2019 by Centrex Metals to Peninsula Ports, which intends to develop Port Spencer as a grain-only deep-water port.
