= Lipschitz =

Lipschitz, Lipshitz, or Lipchitz, is an Ashkenazi Jewish (Yiddish/German-Jewish) surname. The surname has many variants, including: Lifshitz (Lifschitz), Lifshits, Lifshuts, Lefschetz; Lipsitz, Lipshits, Lopshits, Lipschutz (Lipschütz), Lipshutz, Lüpschütz; Libschitz; Livshits; Lifszyc, Lipszyc. It is commonly Anglicized as Lipton, and less commonly as Lipson and Lipington.

There are several places in Europe from where the name may be derived. In all cases, Lip or Lib is derived from the Slavic root lipa (linden tree, see also Leipzig), and the itz ending is the Germanisation of the Slavic place name ending ice.

In the Czech Republic:

- Libčice nad Vltavou (German: Libschitz an der Moldau)
- Liběšice u Litoměřic (German: Liebeschitz bei Leitmeritz)
- Liběšice u Žatce (German: Libeschitz bei Saaz)

In Germany:

- Gera-Liebschwitz
- Liebschützberg-Liebschütz
- Remptendorf-Liebschütz

In Poland:

- Głubczyce (Silesian German: Lischwitz, German: Leobschütz)

In mathematics, the name can be used to describe a function that satisfies the Lipschitz condition, a strong form of continuity, named after Rudolf Lipschitz.

The surname may refer to:

== People ==
- Daniel Lipšic, former Minister of Interior in Slovakia
- Hal Linden, American actor, and television personality, born Harold Lipschitz
- Imre Lakatos, Hungarian philosopher, born as Imre Lipschitz
- Israel Lipschitz (1782–1860), rabbi and biblical scholar
- Jacques Lipchitz (1891–1973), Cubist sculptor
- Lippy Lipshitz (1903–1980), South African sculptor, painter and printmaker
- Oded Lifshitz (1940–2023), Israeli journalist and hostage
- Ralph Lauren, American fashion designer, born as Ralph Lifshitz
- Rudolf Lipschitz (1832–1903), German mathematician
- Solomon Lefschetz (1884–1972), Russian–US mathematician
- Joachim Lipschitz, German politician

== Fictional characters ==
- Dr. Werner P. Lipschitz, fictional character of the Rugrats series
- Richard Lipschitz, fictional character of Team Starkid’s musical Nerdy Prudes Must Die

== Berlin subway station ==
- There is a subway station Lipschitzallee (Lipschitz Avenue) in Berlin, named after politician Joachim Lipschitz
