= Lipson (disambiguation) =

Lipson is a ward in the city of Plymouth, England.

Lipson may also refer to:

- Lipson, South Australia, a locality
- Lipson Cove, a bay in South Australia
- Lipson Island, an island in South Australia
  - Lipson Island Conservation Park, a protected area in South Australia

== People with the surname ==
- D. Herbert Lipson, American magazine publisher
- Ephraim Lipson (1888–1960), British economic historian
- Henry Lipson (1910–1991), British physicist
- Hod Lipson, American robotics researcher
- Stephen Lipson, music producer and guitarist
- Thomas Lipson (ca.1784-1863), Royal Navy officer and South Australian government official

== See also ==
- Lipton (surname)
