= Port Spencer =

- Coordinates: 34°23′S 136°18′E
- Country: Australia
- State: South Australia
- LGA: District Council of Tumby Bay
- Location: 65 km (40 mi) North of Port Lincoln

Government
  - State electorate: Flinders
  - Federal division: Grey
- Elevation: 15 m (49 ft)
- Postcode: 5607
- Mean max temp: 22 °C (72 °F)
- Mean min temp: 14 °C (57 °F)
- Annual rainfall: 330.2 mm (13.00 in)

Port Spencer is a proposed grain export port development project in South Australia. The project site, previously known as Sheep Hill, is on Lower Eyre Peninsula adjacent to Lipson Cove on the western shore of Spencer Gulf.

== History ==
Port Spencer was originally proposed by Centrex Metals for the export of iron ore from iron ore deposits at Wilgerup and in the hills of Koppio on Lower Eyre Peninsula. The project was named Sheep Hill and was contingent on the development of the Fusion Magnetite Project.

The associated mine development was a joint venture partnership between Centrex Metals and Wuhan Iron & Steel (Group) Co, a Chinese government steelmaking enterprise. In October 2016 the joint venture was wound up. In September 2018, agribusiness Free Eyre expressed interest in revisiting and optimising previous plans for Port Spencer exclusively for the export of grain. The port project is currently proposed by Peninsula Ports Pty Ltd (a wholly owned subsidiary of Free Eyre Limited), which has redesigned the project for the export of grain. The port's proponents expect construction to be complete in time for harvest in 2021. The project received development approval from the Government of South Australia in August 2020. The approval was met with some local opposition, who have argued that the project site is too close to the Lipson Island Conservation Park and that the business case for the port development doesn't look viable based on grain export alone.

The interests of project proponents Free Eyre and Peninsula Ports are represented to the South Australian parliament by lobbying firm, Newgate Communications.

== Location and transport ==
The site for Port Spencer is located between Lipson Cove and Rogers Beach, about 20 kilometres (12 mi) northeast of the town of Tumby Bay. The port could be served by a 27-kilometre (17 mi) narrow gauge branchline from Ungarra on the Eyre Peninsula Railway. Lipson Cove lies immediately to the south with the proposed wharf structure 1.5 kilometres north of Lipson Island Conservation Park.

Swaffers Road was marked to become a future haul road. Centrex Metals' preferred method for the long-term transport of ore to the port was via a slurry pipeline. A desalination plant capable of producing 5-20 gigalitres of water per year would have been required to provide the water necessary to transport the ore in a slurry to the Port Spencer site. Once the ore was dewatered, it would have been loaded onto conveyors, along a 500-metre (1,600 ft) jetty and onto capesize bulk carrier vessels.

An alternative development approach announced in November 2013 proposed the ore to be trans-shipped from a shorter jetty in barges, each carrying 15,000 tonnes. If such a method were to be employed, 12 barge-loads (round trips) would be required to fill a single Capesize vessel, with a capacity of 180,000 tonnes.

=== Grain-only revision ===
Free Eyre's 2018 revision of the Port Spencer proposal intends to have grain delivered to the port site by truck, then directly loaded onto Panamax vessels via a single 600 metre-long jetty. The jetty would be supported by ten pylons, and the total cost of the development was estimated to be $130 million AUD. Project costs had been heavily optimised over several years, down from prior estimates of $300–400 million AUD. In 2019, the proponents were seeking $10 million in Federal funding to develop a feasibility study for the project. The prospect of funding such a project was challenged by Senator Rex Patrick, who believes that supporting the Cape Hardy port proposal less than ten kilometres to the north would be a better investment.

In 2020, Peninsula Ports' revised plans for Port Spencer were made available for public comment.

In February 2020, mining industry executive Gordon Toll was appointed to the board of directors of both Free Eyre and its subsidiary, Peninsula Ports.

In May 2022, Peninsula Ports claimed that the new port would be ready for the "next harvest" in 2023: as of September 2025, the current planned opening date (according to the official website) is the end of 2026.

== Environmental approval processes ==
Centrex Metals' port development proposal required three stages of environmental approvals plus associated mine development approvals before ultimately being abandoned by its original proponents.

- The South Australian Development Assessment Commission deemed it appropriate for the project to produce two stages of documentation in the form of Public Environment Reports for South Australian Government approval.
- The Federal Australian Government also deemed it necessary for Centrex Metals to obtain Federal environmental approval for Port Spencer.
- The Federal Environment Department required Centrex Metals Ltd to respond to identified risks to two threatened species known to visit the region- the southern right whale and the fairy tern.

The original Port Spencer (Sheep Hill) proposal was dependent on the advancement of the Fusion Magnetite Project, which required its own environmental approvals at both State and Federal levels. The sale of the Port Spencer site to the FREE Eyre subsidiary Peninsula Ports as a potential grain export facility included the transfer of pre-existing approval for the construction of an iron ore export port and associated infrastructure.

== Development timeline ==
- 6 January 2011 – Project awarded Major Project Status by the South Australian Government
- 1 June 2011 – Guidelines for Public Environment Report released
- 9 March 2012 – Stage 1 Public Environment Report released
- 15 November 2012 – Federal Environment Department determined that approval would be required
- 28 October 2013 – Federal Environment Department approved Stages 1 & 2 with conditions
- 14 December 2015 – Wugang Australian Resources Investment missed a deadline to pay A$4 million into the joint venture
- 14 October 2016 – the joint venture was wound up
- July 2017 – Land previously purchased for the Port Spencer project was publicly advertised for sale.
- June 2019 – Land was purchased by FREE Eyre / Peninsula Ports
- January–February 2020 – Revisions to the original Public Environment Report were made available for public comment.

== Alternatives ==
Another iron ore mining company, Iron Road Limited, has proposed a new port to be constructed at Cape Hardy, 9 km north east of the Port Spencer site. Andrew Stocks, CEO of Iron Road, has stated that only one port is likely to be built in the area. The company considered the site of the proposed Port Spencer project but deemed it unsuitable in 2010. Reflecting on the site choice in 2018, Tim Scholz told the Port Lincoln Times that they saw no business case for switching from Cape Hardy to the Port Spencer site.

Another grain export port has been developed further north in Spencer Gulf at Lucky Bay and is expected to start exporting in the summer of 2020–2021.
