= Brooker, South Australia =

Brooker South Australia
- Coordinates: 34°05′43″S 135°52′30″E
- Population: 76 (2016 census)
- Established: 23 December 1998
- Postcode(s): 5607
- Elevation: 135 m (443 ft)
- Time zone: ACST (UTC+9:30)
  - Summer (DST): ACST (UTC+10:30)
- Location: 266 km (165 mi) W of Adelaide; 38 km (24 mi) NW of Tumby Bay
- LGA(s): District Council of Tumby Bay
- Region: Eyre Western
- County: Jervois
- State electorate(s): Flinders
- Federal division(s): Grey
Mean max temp	Mean min temp	Annual rainfall
21.3 °C; 70 °F	11.4 °C; 53 °F	393.9 mm 15.5 in
Suburbs around Brooker:
Tooligie	Hincks	Hincks
Tooligie; Karkoo; Yeelanna	Brooker	Hincks; Moody; Ungarra
Cummins	Cockaleechie; Ungarra	Ungarra
- Footnotes: Locations; Adjoining localities

Brooker is a locality in the Australian state of South Australia located in the state’s west on Eyre Peninsula about 266 kilometres (165 mi) west of the state capital of Adelaide and about 38 kilometres (24 mi) north-west of the municipal seat in Tumby Bay.

Brooker’s boundaries were created on 23 December 1998 and it was given the ”long established name” which is derived from the cadastral unit of the Hundred of Brooker. It occupies all of the land in the hundred as well as some land to the immediate north in the Hundred of Nicholls.

The Cummins to Kimba branch of the Eyre Peninsula Railway passes through the south-east corner of the locality. A site for a railway station named Moreenia is located on the branch line within the locality.

Land use within Brooker is zoned as primary production which typically consists of “agricultural production and the grazing of stock on relatively large holdings.”

The 2016 Australian census which was conducted in August 2016 reports that Brooker had a population of 76 people.

Brooker is located within the federal division of Grey, the state electoral district of Flinders and the local government area of the District Council of Tumby Bay.
