= Butler, South Australia =

Butler South Australia
- Coordinates: 34.08689761°S 136.16519506°E
- Population: 314 (shared with other localities in the “State Suburb of Lipson”) (2011 census) (Note: For the 2011 census, the ‘State Suburb of Lipson’ consisted of the localities of Butler, Lipson and Port Neill.)
- Established: 1998
- Postcode(s): 5606
- Time zone: ACST (UTC+9:30)
  - Summer (DST): ACST (UTC+10:30)
- Location: 241 km (150 mi) west of Adelaide; 31 km (19 mi) north of Tumby Bay
- LGA(s): District Council of Tumby Bay
- Region: Eyre Western
- County: Jervois
- State electorate(s): Flinders
- Federal division(s): Grey
Mean max temp	Mean min temp	Annual rainfall
22.6 °C; 73 °F	11.5 °C; 53 °F	356.9 mm 14.1 in
Suburbs around Butler:
Hincks	Hincks; Wharminda	Wharminda
Moody; Ungarra	Butler	Port Neill
Ungarra	Lipson; Ungarra	Lipson
- Footnotes: Distances; Coordinates; Climate; Adjoining localities

Butler is a locality in the Australian state of South Australia located on the Eyre Peninsula about 241 kilometres (150 miles) west of the state capital of Adelaide and about 31 kilometres (19 miles) north of the local government seat of Tumby Bay.

Its name and boundaries were both adopted and created in 1998. Its name is reported as being collectively derived from the Butler Tanks, a water storage facility, and the Butler Railway Station which are both located within Butler, and from the cadastral unit of the Hundred of Butler in which it is located. The name is ultimately derived from Richard Butler, a South Australian politician.

A school operated within the current boundaries of the locality from 1905 to 1968.

The route of the Cummins to Buckleboo branch of the Eyre Peninsula Railway passes through the locality from the south-west to the north-east and includes two railway station sites - Butler and Mount Hill.

The principal land use with the locality is agriculture. In 2006, land within the locality was the subject of an exploration license with the name ‘Mount Hill’ held by Eyre Iron Pty Ltd for the purpose of prospecting for iron ore deposits.

Butler is located within the federal division of Grey, the state electoral district of Flinders and the local government area of the District Council of Tumby Bay.

== See also ==
- Butler (disambiguation)
- Mount Hill, South Australia
