= Lipson Cove =

- Location in South Australia
- Location: South Australia
- Coordinates: 34°15′36″S 136°15′47″E
- Type: Bay
- Etymology: Thomas Lipson
- Part of: Spencer Gulf
- Basin countries: Australia
- Max. length: about1.1 km (0.68 mi)
- Average depth: 5.5 m (18 ft)
- Islands: Lipson Island
- Settlements: Lipson

Lipson Cove is a tranquil sandy bay in the Australian state of South Australia on the east coast of Eyre Peninsula overlooking Spencer Gulf. It features in the 2012 book 101 Best Australian Beaches by Andy Short and Brad Farmer.

== Location and access ==
Lipson Cove lies 215 km west-northwest of Adelaide and 63 km northeast of Port Lincoln. The nearest townships are Lipson, inland to the southwest and Port Neill to the north east. It can be accessed from the Lincoln Highway via the Lipson Cove Road. The road is unsealed, but well maintained and always passable for 2-wheel drive vehicles. Basic camping facilities are present behind the dunes near the foreshore.

== History and development ==
Lipson Cove is part of the Barngarla Aboriginal country. Its original Barngarla name is Boodloo.

The name Lipson Cove was given in 1840 by Governor George Gawler after Thomas Lipson R.N., who was South Australia's first harbor master and collector of customs.

A privately owned timber jetty was built there in 1882 some 330 feet long. It cost £1,116 to construct and was extended in 1905. In its early days, it was used to ship wool from Warratta Station. A shearing shed stood near the jetty where the excavations of an underground tank remain. During its working life, the jetty enabled trade in wool, wheat and other goods. In 1931 it was announced that the Harbors Board could no longer justify repairing the jetty. Between 1924 and 1936, 14,035 bags of wheat were shipped via the jetty. It was demolished in 1949 and its timbers were sold. Some partial jetty piles remain in place.

The cove is renowned for its shore-based fishing and an old talc mine which is located nearby. Coastal features include granite hills and cliffs which extend northwards from Lipson Cove to Port Neill. It is also known for its camping, coastal and marine habitats and is regarded as a safe swimming beach. It has been a popular destination for visitors since the 20th century.

Lipson Cove is also the site of the wreck of the ketch, Three Sisters. She was lost on 17 March 1899. The remains of the wooden vessel can sometimes be seen protruding from the beach sand.

In 1919, the remains of an indigenous person's body were exposed by shifting sand at Lipson Cove. Some of the bones had shark teeth embedded in them.

=== Port proposals ===
The cove is adjacent to the proposed site of a bulk commodities export port known provisionally as Port Spencer. The project site lies immediately to the north of Lipson Cove. It was initially proposed by Centrex Metals for the export of iron ore, but the company abandoned the project and put the site up for sale. In 2018, agribusiness Free Eyre expressed interest in purchasing the land and developing a grain export port there instead. A revised proposal was released for public comment in early 2020. The potential environmental impacts of the port proposal have prompted protest from local residents and environmentalists, who are concerned about impacts to Lipson Cove and Lipson Island's recreational and ecological value.

The port could be completed in 2023.

== Lipson Island Conservation Park ==
Lipson Island lies 150 metres out from the Lipson Cove beach can be accessed when the tide is low, but care must be taken not to become stranded as the tide rises. The island and surrounding intertidal zone constitute the Lipson Island Conservation Park which was proclaimed in 1967 and which is a designated IUCN Category III "natural monument." The island is an important rookery for roosting sea birds, including colonies of black-faced cormorant, crested tern and little penguin. The Lipson Island little penguin colony is significant owing to its stable population, while most others of known status in Spencer Gulf are either in decline or have gone extinct. Sooty oystercatchers have also been recorded on the island and New Zealand fur seals visit and haul out there occasionally.

Little penguins are known to the area from at least 1954.

Lipson Island also bears the alternative French name of Ile d'Alembert, so named by French explorer Nicolas Baudin.

== Wildlife ==
Species of conservation significance known to inhabit or visit the area include hooded plovers, fairy terns, white-bellied sea eagles, great white sharks, southern right whales and bottlenose dolphins. Migratory shorebirds known to visit the area include the Sanderling and Sharp-tailed sandpiper.

Introduced species observed in the area include the red fox, rock pigeon and European starling.

As of July 2020, some 92 different organisms have been identified from Lipson Cove, Lipson Island and the surrounding beaches to the north and south. In addition to those iNaturalist observations, the Atlas of Living Australia shows records of 268 species within a 5 km radius of Lipson Cove.

In 2022, local resident Keira Berryman was awarded Young Citizen of the Year by the Tumby Bay Council for her work promoting the environment at Lipson Cove. In 2021, she received a grant to install a sign at the cove that draws visitors' attention to three iconic species: the bottlenose dolphin, little penguin and white-bellied sea eagle.

== Gallery ==
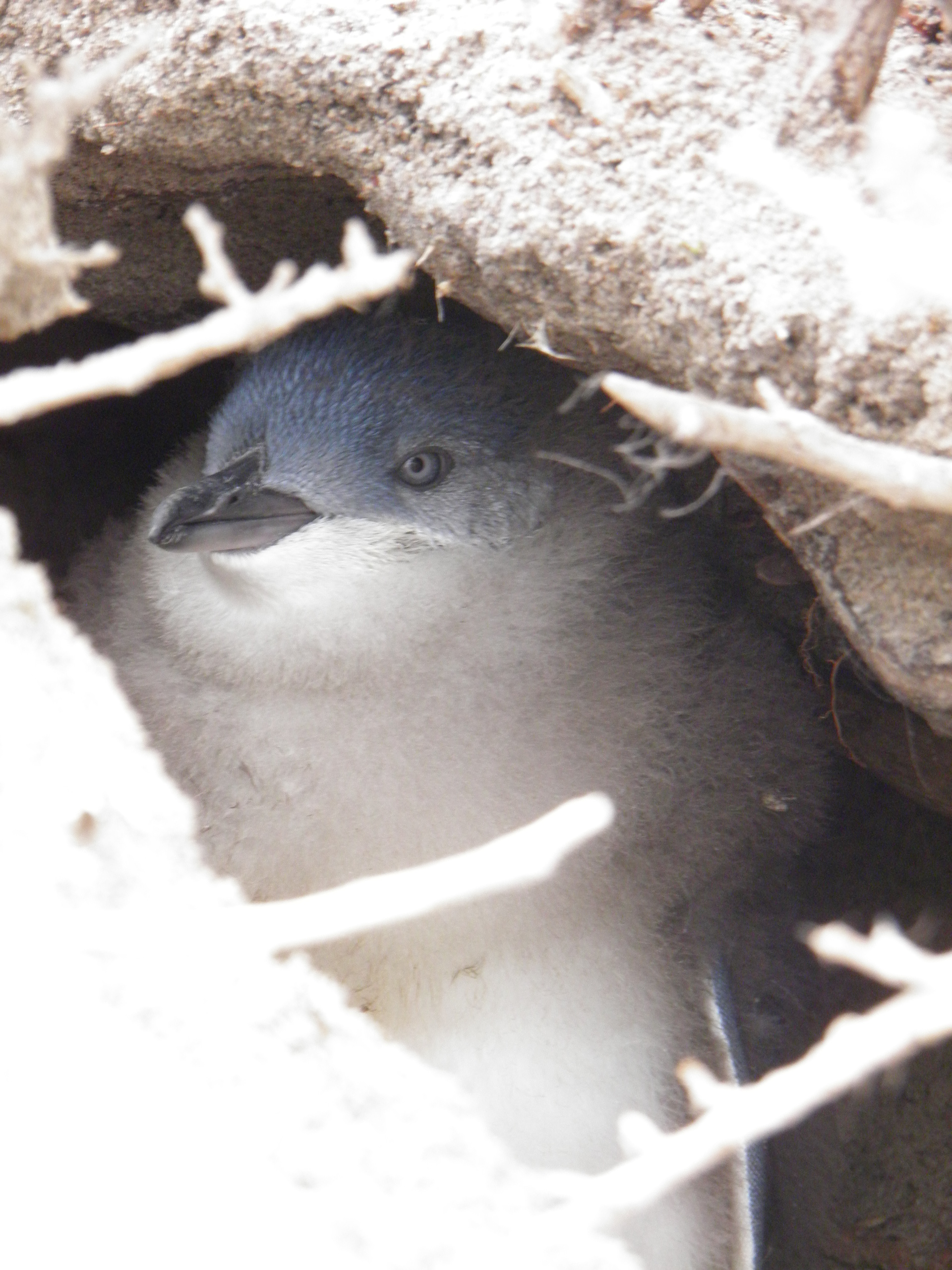
Little penguin in burrow on Lipson Island, Spencer Gulf, South Australia

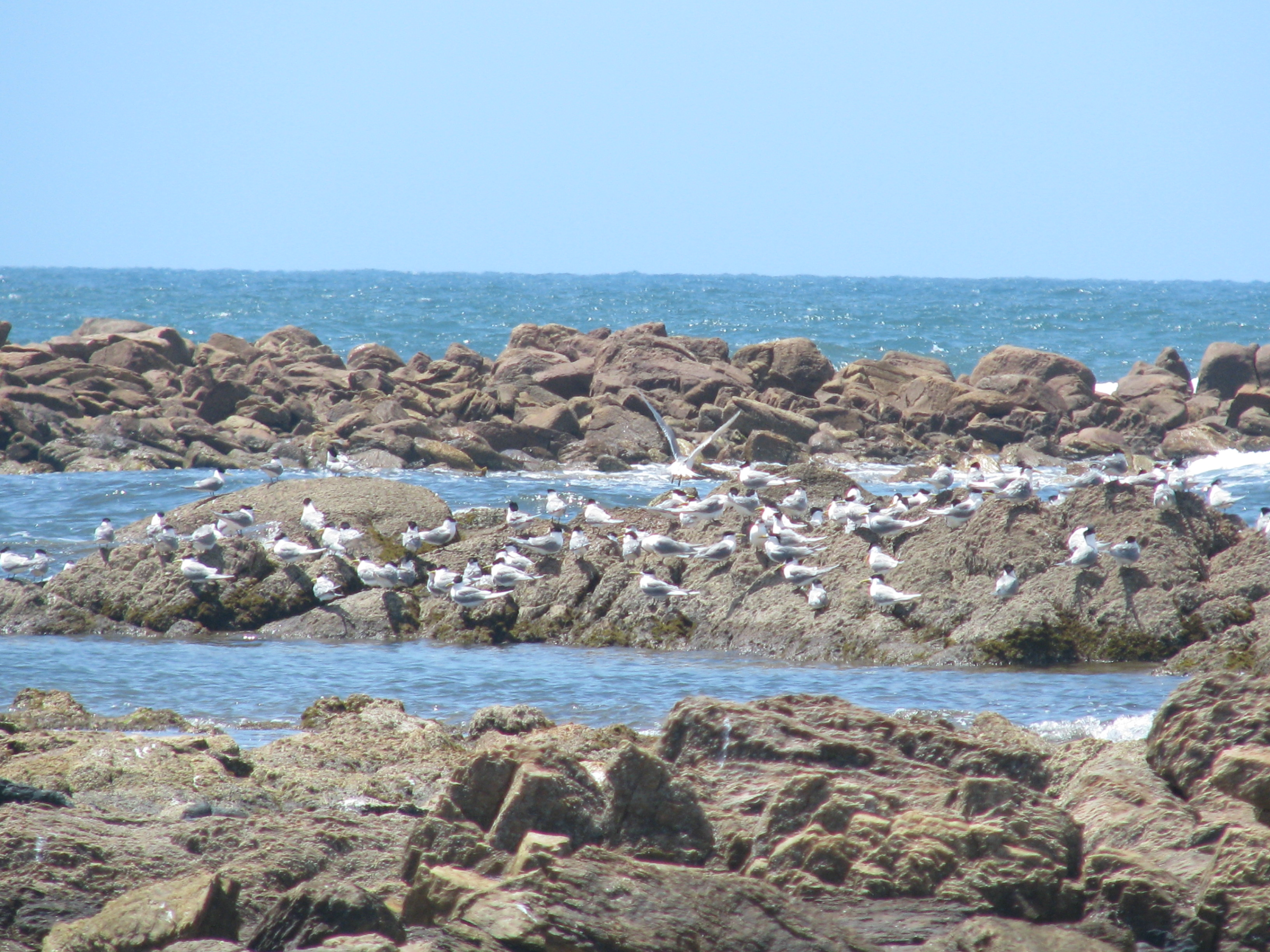
Crested terns at Lipson Cove, Spencer Gulf, South Australia

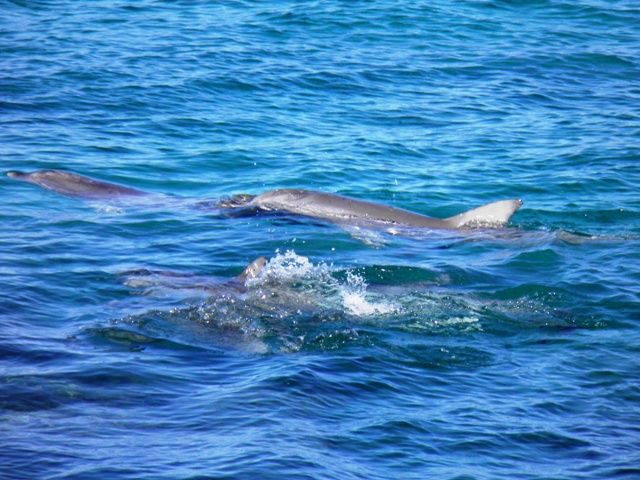
Bottlenose dolphins at Lipson Cove, Spencer Gulf, South Australia

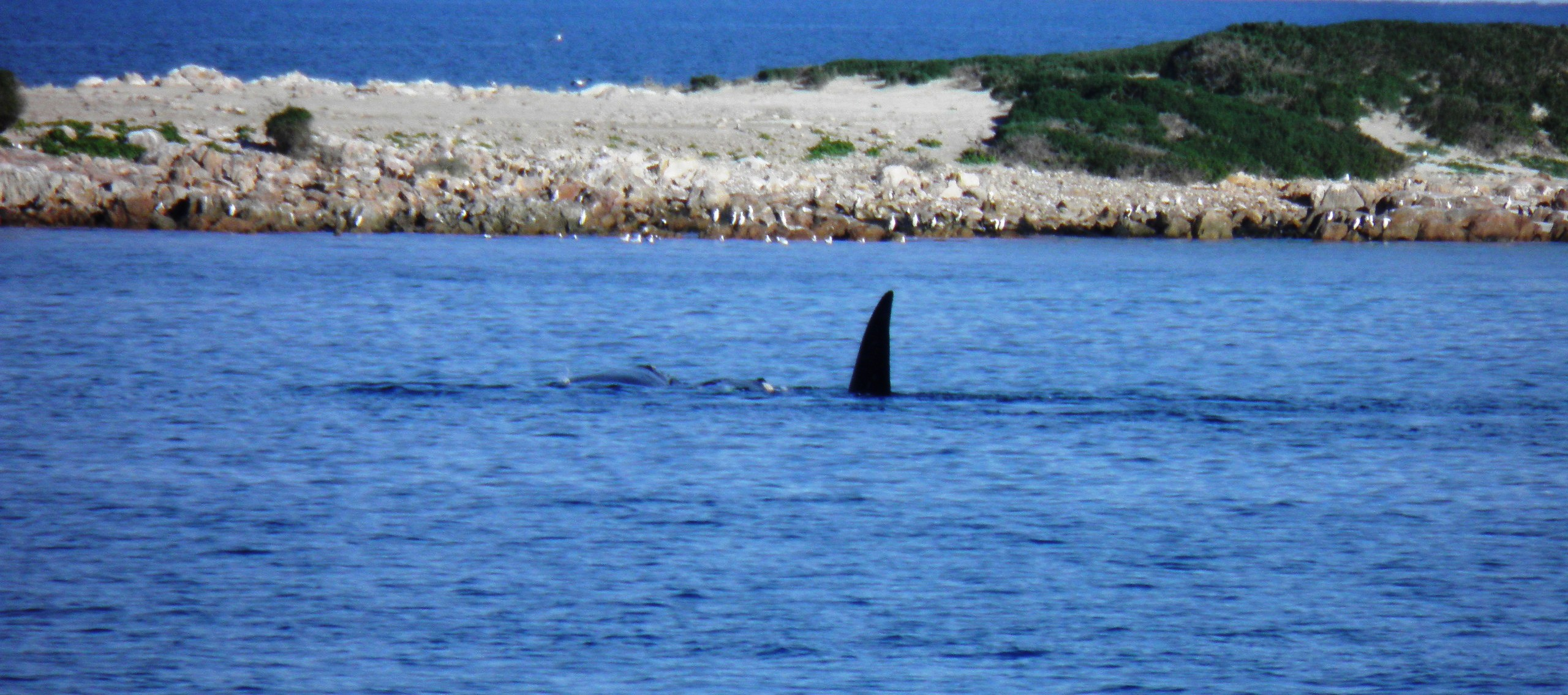
Southern right whale at Lipson Cove, Spencer Gulf, South Australia. Lipson Island Conservation Park appears in the background.

== See also ==
- List of little penguin colonies
