= Lipton (disambiguation) =

Lipton is a British brand of tea.

Lipton may also refer to:

- Lipton (surname)
- Lipton Challenge Cup, football competition
- Lipton Cockton, a 1995 Finnish film
- Lipton Institute of Tea, dedicated tea research facility
- Lipton, Saskatchewan, village in Canada
- Rural Municipality of Lipton No. 217, rural municipality in the Canadian province of Saskatchewan

== See also ==
- Lipson (disambiguation)
