= Moody, South Australia =

Moody South Australia
- Coordinates: 34.04920178°S 136.04603848°E
- Population: 305 (shared with other localities within the “State Suburb of Ungarra”) (2011 census)
- Established: 1978
- Postcode(s): 5607
- Time zone: ACST (UTC+9:30)
  - Summer (DST): ACST (UTC+10:30)
- Location: 257 km (160 mi) west of Adelaide
- LGA(s): District Council of Tumby Bay
- Region: Eyre Western
- County: Jervois
- State electorate(s): Flinders
- Federal division(s): Grey
Mean max temp	Mean min temp	Annual rainfall
22.1 °C; 72 °F	11.4 °C; 53 °F	400.6 mm 15.8 in
Suburbs around Moody:
Brooker	Hincks	Hincks
Brooker	Moody	Butler
Brooker	Ungarra	Butler
- Footnotes: Distances; Coordinates; Climate; Adjoining suburbs

Moody is a locality in the Australian state of South Australia located on the Eyre Peninsula about 257 kilometres (160 miles) west of the state capital of Adelaide. Its name and boundaries were both adopted and created in 1978. Its name is derived from the Hundred of Moody, the cadastral unit in which it is located. Moody is located within the federal division of Grey, the state electoral district of Flinders and the local government area of the District Council of Tumby Bay.

== See also ==
- List of cities and towns in South Australia
