= Lifshitz =

Lifshitz (or Lifschitz) is a surname, which may be derived from the Polish city of Głubczyce (German: Leobschütz).

The surname has many variants, including: Lifshitz, Lifschitz, Lifshits, Lifshuts, Lifshutz, Lefschetz; Lipschitz (Lipshitz), Lipshits, Lipchitz, Lipschutz (Lipschütz), Lipshutz, Lipsitz, Lüpschütz; Libschitz; Livshits; Livshitz; Lifszyc, Lipszyc.

Notable people with the surname include:

- Ada Yonath born Ada Esther Lifshitz (1939–2026), Israeli biochemist and Nobel laureate
- Asaf Lifshitz (1942–2025), Israeli sculptor
- Chava Lifshitz (1936–2005), Austrian-Israeli chemist
- Deborah Lifchitz or Lifszyc (1907–1942), Polish-French ethnologist and linguist
- Dovid Lifshitz (1906–1993), Suvalker Rav, taught at Yeshiva University
- Rabbi Eliezer Meir Lifshitz (1879–1946), for whom the Lifshitz College of Education was named
- Evgeny Lifshitz (1915–1985), Soviet physicist
- Ilya Lifshitz (1917–1982), Soviet physicist (brother of Evgeny)
- J. D. Lifshitz (born 1992), American film director
- May Simón Lifschitz (born 1995), actress and transgender model of Danish and Argentinian descent
- Miguel Lifschitz (1955–2021), Argentine politician, former mayor of the city of Rosario, Santa Fe
- Mikhail Lifshitz (1905–1983), Soviet literary critic and aesthetics philosopher
- Mosze Lifszyc (Aleksander Ford, 1908–1980), Polish film director
- Nechama Lifshitz (1927–2017), Soviet–Israeli singer
- Ofer Lifschitz (born 1958), chairman of Brit Olam party, Israel
- Ralph Lauren (born Ralph Lifshitz 1939), American fashion designer and business executive
- Sébastien Lifshitz (born 1968), French screenwriter and director
- Vladimir Lifschitz (born 1947), Soviet-American computer scientist
- Yaron Lifschitz (born 1970), Australian theatre director most notable for his involvement in the circus arts
