= Free Eyre =

Free Eyre Ltd is an agribusiness based in Eyre Peninsula, South Australia. The company's objectives include exploring and partnering in ventures designed to reduce costs across the supply chain. The company was formed after drought during the 2000s caused hardship to many of the region's growers. It is an unlisted Australian public company whose 475 shareholders represent over half of Eyre Peninsula's farming families. It was incorporated in 2007.

== Port developments ==
In 2016, Free Eyre entered a joint venture port development partnership with Sea Transport with the intention to develop grain export facilities at Lucky Bay. The joint venture company is called Spencer Gulf Trust. In 2018, Free Eyre supported the Weatherill government's plan to establish a South Australian Port Authority and to financially support the development of new port infrastructure but the plan was abandoned when the Liberal party won at the March election. In September 2018, Free Eyre announced another prospect; a revised version of a port proposal previously planned by mining company Centrex Metals under the working name: Port Spencer.
