= Sheep Hill =

Sheep Hill can refer to one of a number of places:

- Sheep Hill, United Kingdom - a village
- Sheep Hill, South Australia - a proposed port
