= Iron Road Limited =

Australian exploration and mining company

Iron Road Ltd
- Traded as: ASX: IRD
- ISIN: AU000000IRD4
- Industry: Mining and metals
- Founded: 2008; 18 years ago in Perth, Western Australia
- Founder: Andrew J. Stocks
- Headquarters: Adelaide, South Australia
- Area served: Eyre Peninsula, South Australia
- Key people: Peter Cassidy (Chairman)
- Total equity: A$129,456,908 (equivalent to $143,147,565 in 2022) (2017)
- Parent: The Sentient Group (74.03% of issued ordinary fully paid shares as at 2020)
- Website: http://www.ironroadlimited.com.au
- Footnotes; Source: Iron Road Limited annual report 2017

Iron Road Ltd is an Australian iron ore exploration and mining company, listed on the Australian Securities Exchange (ASX: IRD) in Perth, Western Australia since 2008 with an objective to develop a world class magnetite mine and infrastructure in South Australia. Its two projects were the Central Eyre Iron Project (CEIP), the planned output of which was to be 24 million tonnes per annum of approximately 67 per cent iron concentrate for almost 30 years; and the Gawler Iron Project, in abeyance as of 2021. The company's corporate office is in Adelaide.

The ultimate parent entity and controlling party is The Sentient Group (incorporated in the Cayman Islands), a manager of closed-end private equity funds specialising in global investments in the natural resource industries, which at 30 June 2020 owned 74.03% of the issued ordinary fully paid shares of Iron Road Limited.

The South Australian government allotted "major development" classification to the Central Eyre Iron Project and the federal government added the rail and port infrastructure to the national Infrastructure Priority List. The company was granted a 21-year mining lease in 2017 for magnetite mining and minerals processing.

In December 2019 the federal government announced a $25 million grant commitment to support development of the company's proposed Cape Hardy port precinct, expected to cost $250 million. In December 2020, the company announced that former South Australian Premier and farming advocate, Rob Kerin, had been appointed project chair.

In March 2022, directors reported the company's main project, the Central Eyre Iron Project, as "the most advanced greenfield high-grade iron concentrate project in Australia (not yet in construction), hosting Australia’s largest magnetite Ore Reserve with a Definitive Feasibility Study (DFS) and optimisation studies complete."

== Financing and project partnerships ==
In April 2017 Iron Road Limited obtained expressions of interest from the China Development Bank, the Industrial and Commercial Bank of China, and the China Construction Bank — the latter two being the world's largest and second largest banks respectively — for project debt financing. The company had signed memoranda of understanding for iron ore offtake with five major Chinese steel mills, including its project partner, Shandong Iron and Steel Group.

Infrastructure for the Central Eyre Iron Project was planned to be built by Iron Road Limited's construction partner, the China Railway Group Limited, the largest infrastructure construction contractor in the world, whose projects had included the 2000 kilometres (1200 miles) US$5 billion Qinghai-Tibet Railway. However, Iron Road's interim report of the half year ended 31 December 2018 stated: "Despite ongoing contact with China Railway Group, the rate of progress has been unacceptable and as a consequence the Company reinvigorated introductions and discussions with various parties that potentially have an interest in the company, the CEIP or select components of the CEIP".

== Iron project approvals ==
In August 2013 the South Australian Government declared the Central Eyre Iron Project as a "major development" — a category applying to developments of major economic, social or environmental importance to the state.

In September 2016 the Australian Government statutory authority, Infrastructure Australia, placed the Central Eyre Iron Project rail and port infrastructure on the national Infrastructure Priority List, which had a total of ten projects on it. The project was also the only "Opportunity for Growth" project in Australia at the time.

In May 2017 the South Australian Government granted a 21-year mining lease for magnetite mining and minerals processing, with 127 compliance conditions flagged. In that month the South Australian Government also gave statutory development authorisation for the proposed port development, utilities corridor and worker village.

Approval under the federal Environment Protection and Biodiversity Conservation Act 1999 in relation to the proposed Cape Hardy port, the remaining primary approval needed from government, was granted in 2018.

== Project details – mining ==
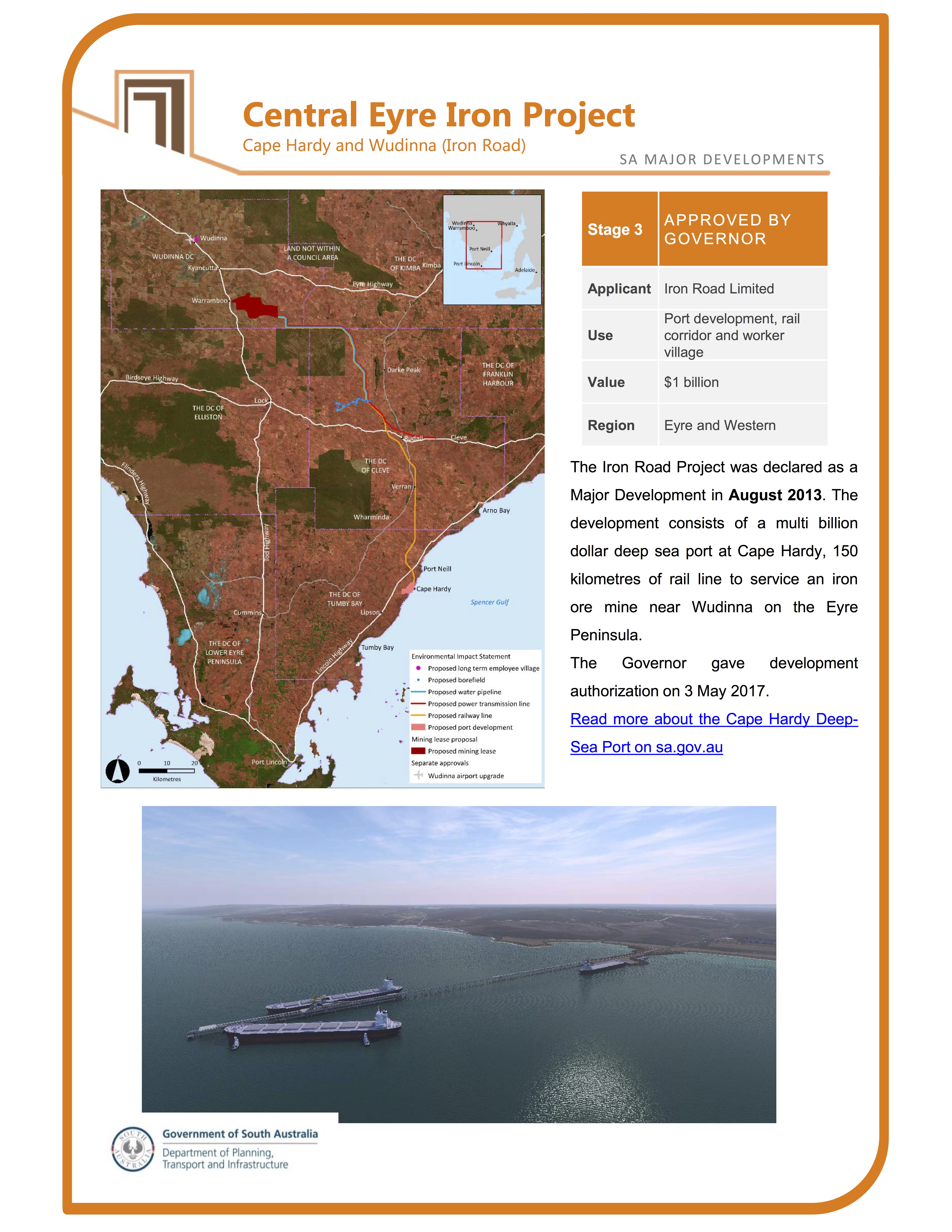
2013 map showing location of the Central Eyre Iron Project mining lease (red), Cape Hardy, and the utilities corridor between them.

The Central Eyre Iron Project is based on three iron occurrences on the Eyre Peninsula (at Warramboo, Kopi and Hambidge) immediately to the east of the small township of Warramboo (33°14′34″S 135°35′38″E), on the Tod Highway 25 km (16 mi) south of the regional centre of Wudinna.

In 2017, Iron Road Limited predicted that the project would become South Australia's largest mining project since the Olympic Dam mine and the largest mine developed in the state's agricultural belt. The mine was anticipated at that time to become an open pit 7 km (4.3 mi) long and 4 km (2.5 mi) at its widest. The ore reserve was stated to be 3.681 billion tonnes @ 15.07% Fe, producing a concentrate grade of approximately 66.7% Fe.

The company stated that it would produce a high quality, low impurity iron concentrate that would serve as a clean, superior blending product for steel manufacturers, and that an output of 24 million tonnes per annum was planned over almost 30 years. Further, the company considered that with a competitive projected operating cost its iron concentrate was well positioned to actively displace lower quality iron ores as steel makers increasingly focus on high quality, low impurity feedstocks.

Construction costs and schedule risk were expected to be reduced significantly by building the processing plant as large self-contained modules in China and commissioning them before being transported to Australia.

The company flagged its concern that a high proportion of power generation sourced from renewable generation without adequate redundancy planning had undermined energy security in South Australia, reducing competitiveness of existing industries and raising new investment hurdles. It stated that it was working through independent and grid-based solutions with government and industry.

=== Halving of mine output target ===
In a January 2019 announcement to the Australian Securities Exchange, Iron Road Limited stated that its annual iron concentrate mine production target had been halved, with an accompanying targeted drop in mine capital costs of more than 50 per cent to US$645 million over an initial 22-year mine life. Total project capital requirements would be reduced from US$4.00 billion to US$1.74 billion. Energy consumption would drop by 66 per cent with mean project power demand dropping to 212 megawatts. These figures were exclusive of the cost of the railway and port, which was to be regarded as a separate project.

== Project details – Cape Hardy deep water port ==
The company acquired land for a new deep water port at Cape Hardy on the western shore of Spencer Gulf, 7 km (4.3 mi) south of Port Neill and 30 km (19 mi) north-east of the regional centre of Tumby Bay. It would be the first deep water port in South Australia. Under plans envisaged in 2017, a 1.3 km (0.8 mi) jetty, capable of handling different commodities, would have two iron ore berths, each capable of accommodating the largest dry bulk cargo vessels (Capesize). The planned ship loader capacity would be 70 million tonnes per annum. An additional capacity of 50 million tonnes per annum would be available for third-party users. The company also stated that it contemplated "staged construction and commissioning of a globally competitive grain terminal and export facility at Cape Hardy".

=== Higher priority for port development ===
A December 2020 announcement of its Cape Hardy Stage 1 port development project signified a change in shorter-term company priorities: a grain terminal and multi-user, multi-commodity export facilities would be established ahead of the Central Eyre Iron Project mining and beneficiation operations. Named Portalis, the project was to be a joint venture between Iron Road Limited, Eyre Peninsula Co-operative Bulk Handling, and Macquarie Capital. The planned 250 million investment would be supported by the federal government's $25 million grant commitment, made 12 months previously in view of the port's economic significance.

=== Grain handling ===
Iron Road Limited's plans originally included a 148 km (92 mi) utilities corridor from Warramboo to Cape Hardy, comprising a service road, power line, water pipeline, and standard-gauge heavy-haul railway line for iron ore transportation. Following an assessment of opportunities to use planned rail and port infrastructure to export grain by the company and Emerald Grain (a grain marketing and supply chain company wholly owned by Sumitomo Corporation), it was envisaged that the railway line would also carry grain to Port Hardy from Eyre Peninsula's grain-growing areas. In 2017, the company stated that growers would "appreciate an alternative modern and efficient export route for their grains, and above all we bring choice". Two years later, however, the company announced it had dropped rail transport in favour of "high-capacity, dual-powered road trains" operating on a private haul road.

== Gawler Iron Project ==
Iron Road Limited's Gawler Iron Project, covering an area of 3380 km^{2} (1310 sq mi), is about 270 km (170 mi) north-west of the Central Eyre Iron Project; its southern boundary is about 25 km (16 mi) north of the Trans-Australian Railway and about 80 km (50 mi) west-northwest of the railway junction of Tarcoola. The company has estimated that the project has mineralisation capable of supporting a small to medium scale magnetite mine with an output of 1–2 million tonnes per annum. The potential to produce iron concentrate using a simple beneficiation process was also envisaged. A scoping study was completed in 2013, but the company stated subsequently that it had conducted little further evaluation because it was focusing "all effort" on its Central Eyre Iron Project.
