= Tumby Island Conservation Park =

Protected area in South Australia

- IUCN category Ia (strict nature reserve)
- Location within South Australia
- Location: South Australia
- Nearest city: Tumby Bay
- Coordinates: 34°24′33″S 136°8′25″E
- Area: 48 ha (120 acres)
- Established: 9 January 1969
- Governing body: Department for Environment and Water

Tumby Island Conservation Park is a protected area in the Australian state of South Australia associated with Tumby Island in Spencer Gulf and located about 5 kilometres (3.1 miles) southeast of the town of Tumby Bay.

The conservation park consists of land described as "section 682, north out of hundreds, county of Flinders", being the entirety of Tumby Island. The land first acquired protected area status as a fauna conservation reserve declared on 9 January 1969 under the Fauna Conservation Act 1964-1965. On 27 April 1972, the fauna conservation reserve was reconstituted as the Tumby Island Conservation Park under the National Parks and Wildlife Act 1972. On 19 December 1991, additional land was added to the conservation park to extend protection over land located between high tide and low tide. As of 2018, it covered an area of 48 hectares (120 acres).

The area under protection is considered significant for the following reason: "a small island providing feeding and roosting habitat for seabirds".

The conservation park is classified as an IUCN Category Ia protected area. In 1980, it was listed on the now-defunct Register of the National Estate.
