= Hincks, South Australia =

Hincks South Australia
- Coordinates: 33.86787330°S 135.93971402°E
- Population: 0 (SAL 2016)
- Established: 23 December 1998
- Postcode(s): 5603
- Time zone: ACST (UTC+9:30)
  - Summer (DST): ACST (UTC+10:30)
- Location: 253 km (157 mi) west of Adelaide
- LGA(s): District Council of Cleve; District Council of Tumby Bay
- Region: Eyre Western
- County: Jervois
- State electorate(s): Flinders
- Federal division(s): Grey
Mean max temp	Mean min temp	Annual rainfall
23.2 °C; 74 °F	9.9 °C; 50 °F	427.3 mm 16.8 in
Suburbs around Hincks:
Murdinga	Murlong; Rudall	Rudall
Tooligie	Hincks	Rudall; Verran; Wharminda
Tooligie	Brooker; Moody; Butler	Butler
- Footnotes: Distances; Adjoining suburbs

Hincks is a locality in the Australian state of South Australia located on the Eyre Peninsula about 253 kilometres (157 miles) west of the state capital of Adelaide.

Its name and boundaries were both adopted and created in 1998. Its name is derived from both the Hundred of Hincks in which it is partly located, and the Hincks Conservation Park which covered its full extent in 1998. As of 2004, the full extent of Hincks is covered by the protected area known as the Hincks Wilderness Protection Area.

Hincks is located within the federal division of Grey, the state electoral district of Flinders and the local government areas of the District Council of Cleve and the District Council of Tumby Bay.

== See also ==
- List of cities and towns in South Australia
