= Janette Octoman =

Australian community worker and would-be politician

Janette Hannum Octoman
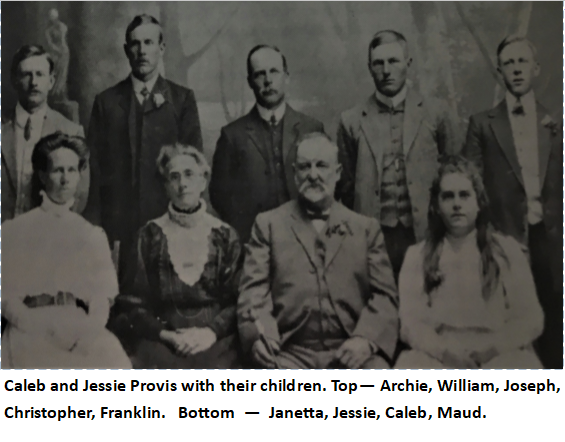
- Born: November 14, 1879; Port Lincoln
- Died: October 23, 1971 (aged 91); Leabrook
- Spouse: Charles Mashon Octoman (spelled Ochtomann until 1919)

Janette Hannum Octoman MBE born Janetta Provis (November 14, 1879 – October 23, 1971) was an Australian Country Women's Association's community worker and would-be politician.

== Life ==
Octoman was born in 1879 in Port Lincoln in South Australia. She was given the name Janetta after her mother who had been born with the name Patterson in Australia. In 1940 she changed her first name to Janette. Her father was Caleb Provis and he was an English immigrant farmer. Caleb's father, Joseph, lived with them and he became her teacher. She married Charles Mashon Ochtomann (spelt Octoman beginning in 1919) in 1903.

In 1933, she first took an interest in the South Australian Country Women's Association and she founded the branch at Tumby Bay. In 1937 she was elected as President of the CWA's Eyre Peninsula division and she served until 1940. She took a second period as President from 1943 for another three years.

In 1941 and lacking endorsement she stood as a Liberal to represent the Electoral district of Flinders and she gained 8% of the votes. She had tried to gain endorsement by the Liberal Party in 1937, 1939, 1940, 1943 and 1944 for the legislative assembly and in one case for the senate. She stood for the last time in 1944 for election and she took 410 of the votes.

In 1949, she became a widow and the President of the Country Women's Association of South Australia. She was re-elected several times and during her tenure she created holiday homes.

In 1953, she was recognised in the New Years Honours list and she was awarded an MBE.

In 1970, the CWA in collaboration with Tumby Bay's council planted an avenue of trees in her name. Octoman died in Leabrook in South Australia in 1971.
