= Eric Kotz =

South Australian fisherman, scuba diver, mariner and social historian

Eric Kotz is a South Australian fisherman, scuba diver, mariner and social historian. He is the self-published author of three books: The Jawesome Coast (2016) and The Butcher's Son from Tumby Bay (2015) and Sir Joseph Banks Group (2018). His most recent work is dedicated to the eponymous group of islands in Spencer Gulf, South Australia. He lives in Tumby Bay, South Australia and his publications focus on life in the Eyre Peninsula and Spencer Gulf regions. Eric Kotz is a shell collector and a member of Bite Club, a support group for survivors of shark attacks and the friends and relatives of victims. In 2017, Kotz claimed that 3 or 4 sharks had been shot in South Australia as a form of vigilante shark control.
