= Tumby Island =

Island in South Australia

Coordinates: 34°24′38″S 136°8′19″E

- Location within South Australia

Geography
- Location: Spencer Gulf

Administration
- Australia

Tumby Island is a low bedrock island located 500 m (1,600 ft) east of the southern tip of Tumby Bay (Tumby Point) in Spencer Gulf, South Australia. The island is a conservation park comprising 35 ha (86 acres).

== History ==
The island was named by explorer Matthew Flinders in 1802, after his native parish in England.

On 20 April 1909, a 15–16 ft (4.6–4.9 m) great white shark was caught near Tumby Island by Captain Simms and the crew of the fishing cutter Minnie Simms. It was almost 10 ft (3.0 m) in circumference, and its jaws measured 2 ft (0.61 m) across. Some of its teeth were bought by people in Tumby Bay.

On 26 December 1914, the region's first boating fatality was recorded, involving a boat en route to Tumby Island departing from Tumby Bay. Mr W. A. L. Williams, chemist, was killed when his boat Dolphin capsized. All six passengers aboard survived.

In 1969, Tumby Island was proclaimed a conservation park (Tumby Island Conservation Park) and is managed under South Australia's National Parks and Wildlife Act 1972. The area is around 35 ha (86 acres). As of 2011, no management plan exists for the park.

The island is classified by IUCN as a Category 1A conservation asset, which means that it has been "strictly set aside to protect biodiversity and also possibly geological/geomorphological features, where human visitation, use and impacts are strictly controlled and limited".

== Access ==
The island can be accessed on foot at low tide by traversing shallow water-covered rock flats and curving sand. Visitors should request access permission from DEWNR (Government of South Australia) before visiting and be mindful of the presence of Death adders.

== Features ==
On the northern side of the island there is a 350-metre (1,150 ft) long sandy beach fronted by 100–200-metre (330–660 ft) wide rock and sand flats. The remainder of the island has low rock bluffs, which are steep on the southern side. Waters close to Tumby Island are known for their fishing. Popular targeted species include snapper and tommy ruff. These are best accessed from the mainland, or by boat.

== Flora and fauna ==
The island is known to host a population of death adders, which represent a potential threat to human visitors.

The island also provides roosts and breeding habitat for a variety of seabird species. The endangered fairy tern and the vulnerable eastern curlew and banded stilt have been recorded in the Tumby Island / Cape Euler coastal cell.

The island is also a nesting place for the eastern osprey, an endangered species in SA. After finding that foxes had been stealing eggs, the Friends of Osprey conservation group and National Parks and Wildlife Service South Australia installed towers to provide an elevated platform for ospreys to nest. Their efforts were rewarded on Tumby Island, where a chick hatched in October 2023.
