= Moody Tank Conservation Park =

Protected area in South Australia

- IUCN category III (natural monument or feature)
- Location within South Australia
- Location: South Australia
- Nearest city: Cummins
- Coordinates: 34°10′S 135°59′E
- Area: 78 ha (190 acres)
- Established: 7 December 2006
- Governing body: Department for Environment & Water

Moody Tank Conservation Park is a protected area located in the Australian state of South Australia on the Eyre Peninsula about 26 kilometres (16 miles) north-east of Cummins.

In 2007, the conservation park was described by its managing authority as follows:

Moody Tank Conservation Park was proclaimed on 7 December 2006 under the National Parks and Wildlife Act 1972, to protect and conserve endemic, remnant vegetation and a site of heritage significance. The park was proclaimed without access under State mining legislation. Moody Tank Conservation Park contains four major vegetation communities, one of which (Eucalyptus peninsularis, E. leptophylla and E. pileata open mallee) is listed as threatened in South Australia. The park also protects numerous plant species of conservation significance and provides suitable habitat for the nationally vulnerable Granite Mudwort (Limosella granitica).

The conservation park is located in the locality of Ungarra and be accessed from its south side by a road named Yeelana Road which connects to the Lincoln Highway in the east and the Tod Highway in the west.

The conservation park includes the Moody Rocks Water Tank (also known as the Moody Reservoir) which is listed on the South Australian Heritage Register and is the feature from which the conservation park's name is derived. The water tank was constructed in 1913 to supply water to steam locomotives using the railway line located on the south side of Yeelana Road which is a branch of the Eyre Peninsula Railway.

The conservation park is classified as an IUCN Category III protected area.

== See also ==
- Protected areas of South Australia
