= Thomas Lipson =

British Royal Navy officer (1784–1863)

Captain Thomas Lipson
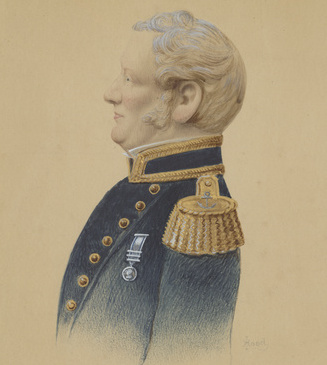
- Portrait of Lipson by John Hood, c. 1870
- Born: c. 1784; Dartmouth, England
- Died: 25 October 1863 Adelaide, South Australia
- Buried: West Terrace Cemetery, Adelaide
- Allegiance: United Kingdom of Great Britain and Ireland
- Branch: Royal Navy
- Service years: 1793–1855
- Rank: Captain
- Spouse: Elizabeth Emma Fooks (m. 1812)
- Children: 6
- Other work: First Collector of Customs, Naval Officer and Harbour Master of South Australia, 1836–1855; Master of the Marine Board, 1852–1854

Thomas Lipson

Captain Thomas Lipson (c. 1784 – 25 October 1863) was an officer in the Royal Navy, who, after a successful if unspectacular career in the Royal Navy, was appointed by the Admiralty as the first Harbour Master at South Australia, arriving there with the pioneer settlers. Serving from 1836 to 1855, based at Port Adelaide, Lipson also superintended many of the initial maritime surveys of that new colony.

He was born in Dartmouth, England. In 1793, at the age of 9 or 10, joined the Royal Navy as a first-class volunteer on Windsor Castle under Captain Sir Thomas Byard. In 1797, he served under Byard on Bedford, at the Battle of Camperdown.

== Career ==
In 1798, he served in Foudroyant under Byard at the Battle of Tory Island. He was present at the Battle of the Nile and the taking of Toulon; during the rest of the war as midshipman and master's mate in Princess Charlotte, Ruby, and Isis. He then served for short periods on Neptune, Amphion and Hydra. In 1803, he joined Montagu and assisted at the blockade of the enemy's ports from Brest to the Dardanelles. He was present on 22 August 1805, in Admiral Cornwallis's attack on the French fleet close to Brest harbour, when Montagu engaged with L'Alexandre (described in the reference as a ship of 80 guns).

On 24 January 1808, Lipson was nominated Acting Lieutenant of Sabrina off Cádiz; the promotion was made official on 29 June 1809. In 1810 he was made Senior Lieutenant of Bonne Citoyenne on the South American station. He served afterwards in HMS Laurustinus (described in the reference as a ship of 24 guns), and Barfleur on the Brazilian and Mediterranean stations.

In 1814 and 1815 in Iphigenia, HMS Torrent (described in the reference as a ship of 80 guns), and Royal Sovereign, on the North American and home stations. Captain Lipson was awarded a medal and two clasps for general actions during the war. In January 1817 he was in charge of the revenue cutter Lapwing, when she parted from her cables and was driven from her anchorage in Mill Bay, Plymouth, and went ashore high and dry over a ridge of rocks "with comparatively but little damage". He was in command of the Lapwing on 11 May 1818 when 17 casks of contraband spirits were seized.

Lapwing (built 1808 in Mevagissey, Cornwall) was to turn up later in South Australia - she was brought to Port Adelaide in May 1850 and sold to merchant Ephraim Teakle. She made regular voyages to the Perth, Western Australia and Melbourne, Victoria. In 1852 she was sold to Captain George Hall, William Paxton and Captain Henry Simpson (d. 26 April 1884), and in April 1853 transferred to Captain William Francis Jnr. She was wrecked at Port Elliot on 6 September 1856 during a gale, when the government moorings gave way. The crew escaped unharmed but two sailors died when they attempted to return to the vessel. The ship was not insured and Captain Francis was bankrupted.

He was appointed Commander on 4 March 1819.

In 1836, Commander Lipson was appointed by the Admiralty as Naval Officer for South Australia, by the Colonial Government as Harbour-Master at Port Adelaide and Administrator of Marine Affairs, and by the Hon. Commissioners of H.M. Customs as Collector for South Australia. He made several surveys of the South Australian coast for the Home Government.

In 1840 he resigned the Customs position, but held the former two until 1855, when he was given rank as Post-Captain and retired on a life pension. He was appointed Master of the Trinity House Board (later renamed Marine Board) in 1852, a post he resigned in 1854 to be controversially replaced by Capt. B. Douglas.

Lipson died on 25 October 1863 and was interred at West Terrace Cemetery.

== Character ==
When Lipson was eulogised in the South Australian Register, remark was given to his character. It noted a "general urbanity and affability which at all times marked his conduct in his intercourse with persons of inferior rank in life. An old acquaintance, though he might be in humble garb, was to him an old friend, and was recognised as such wherever met, and many a time has his warm heart flushed his happy face on meeting a subordinate or tradesman busy about his ordinary duties. Open-hearted, candid, and outspoken himself, he sought and felt delight in association with similar minds, wherever he found them."

== Family ==
Thomas Lipson married Elizabeth Emma Fooks (1791–1880) of Melcombe Regis on 30 July 1812. They travelled to South Australia on the "Cygnet" with six children:

- Emma (Mary Ann) Catherine Berry Lipson (1813–1876)
- Berry James Lipson (1816–1872)
- Mary Fooks Lipson (1821–1898)
- Eliza Anne Lipson (died 1845)
- Thomas Hardy Lipson (1823–1862)
- Louisa Lipson (1829–1918)

== Legacy ==
A plaque at the wharf, Port Adelaide, is dedicated to him and many landmarks and geographical features were named in his honor. They include:

- Lipson Street in Port Adelaide
- Lipson Reach - a section of the Port River on the North Arm, Port Adelaide
- Lipson Cove, which lies midway between Tumby Bay and Port Neill
- Lipson Island (and Lipson Island Conservation Park) - an inshore island adjacent to Lipson Cove
- Lipson - a small inland township north of Port Lincoln
- Lipson's Breakwater - a natural rocky headland at Port Elliot
- Lipson's Island, Port Elliot

Street names with a possible connection are: Lipson Place in Port Lincoln, Lipson Avenue in Kadina, Lipson Road in Wallaroo and Lipson Grove in Hawthorn. Maybe also Lipson Terrace, Robe, SA
