= Wharminda, South Australia =

Wharminda
- Suburb
- Coordinates: 33.95378624°S 136.24576287°E
- Country: Australia
- State: South Australia
- Region: Eyre Western
- LGA: District Council of Cleve
- Location: 242 km (150 mi) west of Adelaide
- Established: 1998

Government
  - State electorate: Flinders
  - Federal division: Grey

Population
  - Total: 19 (SAL 2021)
- Time zone: UTC+9:30 (ACST)
  - Summer (DST): UTC+10:30 (ACST)
- Postcode: 5603
- County: Jervois
- Mean max temp: 22.6 °C (72.7 °F)
- Mean min temp: 11.5 °C (52.7 °F)
- Annual rainfall: 356.9 mm (14.05 in)
Suburbs around Wharminda
Hincks	Verran	Verran
Hincks	Wharminda	Verran
Butler	Butler; Port Neill	Port Neill
- Location; Climate; Coordinates; Adjoining localities

Wharminda is a locality in the Australian state of South Australia located on the Eyre Peninsula about 242 kilometres (150 miles) west of the state capital of Adelaide.

Its boundaries were created in 1998 in respect to "the long established name" which is reported as being derived from the "native name of a spring and range of hills in the area", with the spring being known as "The Wharminda Soak", and the literal translation of the word "Wharminda" being "weak water". Wharminda is pronounced "war-minda". It is unknown as to why a silent "h" was used.

Wharminda Primary School opened as Wharminda Siding School in 1914, and closed in December 2008. The locality also contains a hall, cricket/football oval, netball (netball was called basketball at the time of use) and tennis courts. All of the sporting facilities have now ceased use. Wharminda Cricket team was most famous for losing 9 cricket Grand Finals in a row, before finally winning on their 10th Grand Final appearance in 1985.

A postal receiving office opened at Wharminda on 5 January 1914, became a licensed post office on 11 January 1994, and closed on 24 September 1999. The Post Office served as a manual telephone exchange with hours of 7am to 9pm during the week and limited times on the weekend, and a grocery and fuel store.

It also formerly had a siding on the Eyre Peninsula Railway, which still runs through Wharminda, though use of the train line stopped in May 2019. 4 railway cottages for workers were originally built, but all were removed in the late 1970s.

The principal land use within the locality is 'primary production' which is mainly concerned with "grazing and cropping." A number of well known cattle and sheep studs were located in the area.

The area was predominantly of the Christian faith, with a Methodist, later changing to Uniting Church, held in the Wharminda Hall, and Lutheran, with worshippers travelling to Butler Lutheran Church to practice.

The Country Women's Association (CWA) held meetings in the Wharminda Hall with most Women in the district being members. In addition, the Wharminda Agricultural Bureau also held meetings in the Wharminda Hall with most Men in the district being members.

It also includes the protected area known as the Wharminda Conservation Park.

Wharminda is located within the federal division of Grey, the state electoral district of Flinders and the local government area of the District Council of Cleve.
