= Lipson, South Australia =

Lipson
- Town
- Coordinates: 34°17′S 136°7′E
- Country: Australia
- State: South Australia
- Region: Eyre Western
- LGA: District Council of Tumby Bay
- Location: 235 km (146 mi) North West of Adelaide; 12 km (7.5 mi) North West of Tumby Bay
- Established: 1872

Government
  - State electorate: Flinders
  - Federal division: Grey
- Elevation: 25 m (82 ft)

Population
  - Total: 209 (2006 census)
- Postcode: 5607
- County: Flinders
Localities around Lipson
Ungarra	Butler; Port Neill
Ungarra	Lipson	Spencer Gulf
Tumby Bay	Tumby Bay
- Location; Adjoining localities

Lipson is an historic farming town on the Eyre Peninsula, located only 12 km (7.5 mi) from Tumby Bay, South Australia. At the 2006 census, Lipson had a population of 209.

Today, Lipson is little more than a historic tourist attraction, with very few permanent residents.

== History ==
The township was named after Thomas Lipson, a naval officer born in 1783, who came to South Australia in 1836 and was appointed collector of customs and harbour master at Port Adelaide. Lipson was once a well established town, having a number of facilities including a post office, church, shop and a school. The school opened in 1881 as Yaranyacka school and closed in 1950.

Nearby mines produced some of the finest talc in the world, but with the closing of the mines, the town gradually died. The district surrounding Lipson is agricultural, with sheep and cereal crops prevalent.

The Ungarra, Butler and Lipson Football clubs merged in 1963 to form the Eyre united Football Club, with the oval now located at Ungarra.

Despite the waning of the town, the annual Lipson show has continued, with Tumby Bay residents and tourists flocking to the show each year. In 2004, the show celebrated its 100th year in operation.

== Lipson Cove ==
Only a few kilometres toward the coast from the town, Lipson Cove is a bay with camping facilities. The cove is renowned for its fishing and the old talc mine is located nearby. This area has exposed granite coastal hills and cliffs that extend from Lipson Cove to Port Neill. Lipson Island can be accessed when the tide is low, but care must be taken not to get stranded. The island and surrounding intertidal zone constitutes the Lipson Island Conservation Park which was proclaimed in 1967. The island is an important rookery for roosting sea birds, including a colony of little blue penguin. Lipson Island also bears the alternative French name of Ile d'Alembert.

== See also ==
- List of cities and towns in South Australia
- Hundred of Yaranyacka
