= Mount Hill (South Australia) =

Mountain in South Australia

- Korti Purre, previously Bluff Mount
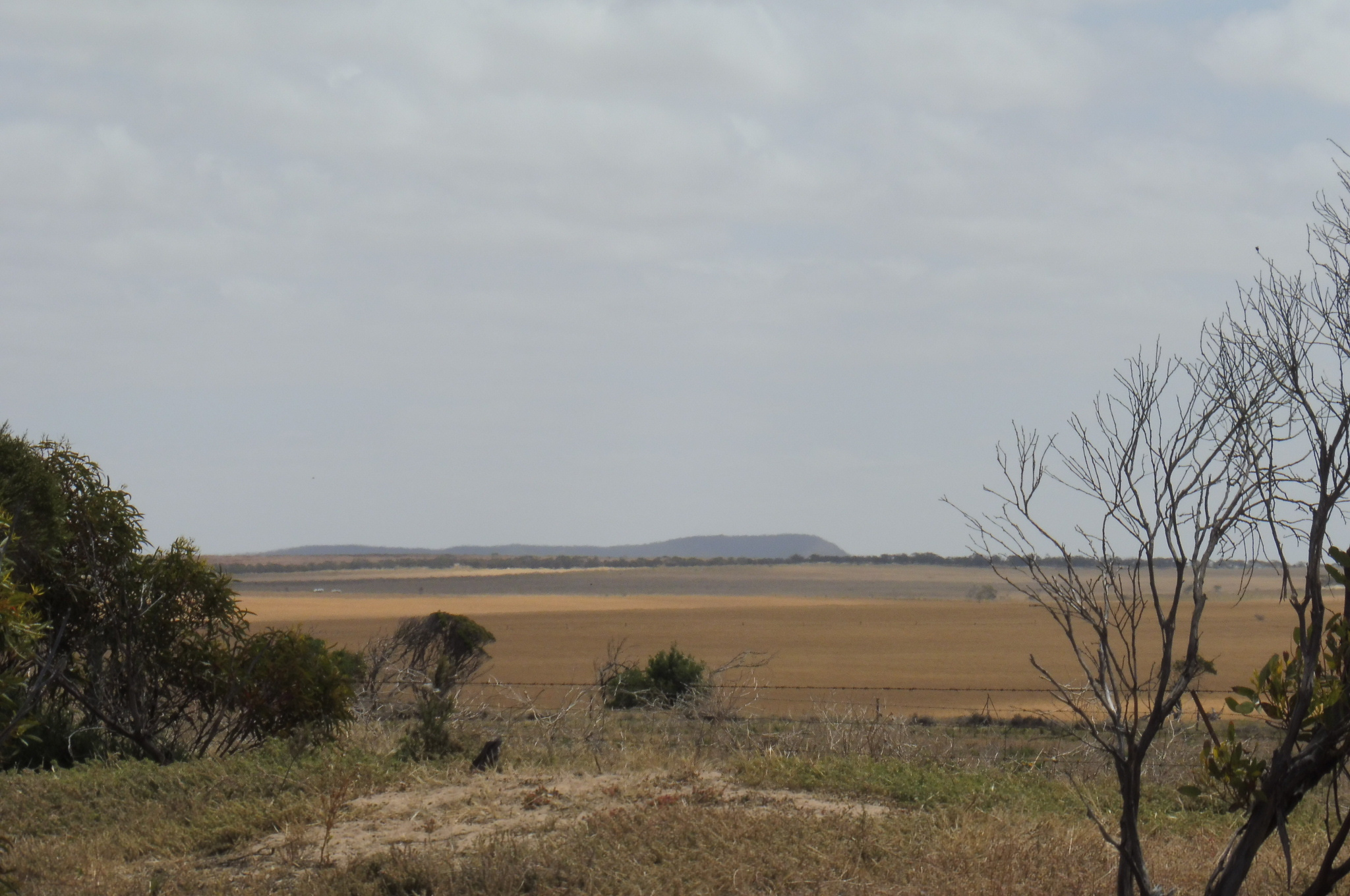
- Mount Hill, showing its bluff northern face, as viewed looking in a westerly direction from Lincoln Highway near Port Neill, at a range of about 20 km.

Highest point
- Elevation: 450 m (1,480 ft)
- Coordinates: 34°04′S 136°14′E

Geography
- Location within South Australia
- Location: Butler, South Australia, Australia

Climbing
- First ascent: 20 April 1840; George Gawler, John Hill and Thomas Burr

Mount Hill (Alternative name:Korti Purre, also previously known as Bluff Mount) is a prominent peak in the Australian state of South Australia on the eastern side of southern Eyre Peninsula. It is located within the locality of Butler.

== Geography ==
Mount Hill is the southern peak of a low range of hills lying along the eastern coast of Eyre Peninsula and is about 25 kilometres (16 mi) west of Spencer Gulf. At an elevation of about 450 metres (1,480 ft) above sea level, the isolated peak is a prominent landmark from the gulf. The surrounding country, originally very scrubby, has been mostly cleared for cropping. The nearest town is Port Neill. A railway siding located on the Eyre Peninsula Railway to the north-west of the hill has the name 'Mount Hill.'

== History ==
The first European to sight this peak was Matthew Flinders, who sailed past on 7 March 1802 and noted it in his log as 'a bluff inland mountain' and on his chart as a 'bluff mount', alluding to the bluffness of its northern face.

It was named Mount Hill on or about 20 April 1840 by Governor George Gawler when he was exploring this coast northwards on horseback from Port Lincoln accompanied by explorer and landholder John Hill and Deputy Surveyor General Thomas Burr. Their expedition was supported at sea by the brig Porter and the government cutter Water Witch. For the purpose of gaining a better view of the unexplored interior of Eyre Peninsula, Gawler and party ascended the peak, at which time it was named after John Hill.

The party then proceeded northward past Mount Olinthus (which they also ascended and named) toward the Middleback Ranges, before returning to Franklin Harbour which Gawler also named and is at present, the site for the town of Cowell.

Water Witch and Porter parted there, with Porter returning to Port Lincoln with Gawler and Water Witch to Adelaide via Point Riley, near Wallaroo. On 28 April 1840 near Point Riley Hill and Burr disembarked, the pair returning overland on horseback to Adelaide, thereby being the first Europeans to traverse northern Yorke Peninsula.

The second recorded European exploration party to ascend Mount Hill was that of explorer Edward John Eyre, on 30 September 1840.

A book titled In the Shadow of the Bluff gives a detailed account of the history of Mount Hill and the Hundred of Butler.
