= Lipshutz =

Lipshutz is a surname. It is a variant of Lifshitz. Notable people with the surname include:

- Bruce H. Lipshutz (born 1951), American chemist
- Robert Lipshutz (1921–2010), American lawyer

== See also ==
- Lipschutz
