= Lipschutz =

Lipschutz is a Jewish surname. It is a variant of Lifshitz.

== Notable people with this surname ==
- Gerdi E. Lipschutz (1923–2010), New York politician
- S. Lipschütz (1863–1905), US chess champion
- Seymour Lipschutz (born 1931), American mathematician
- Dr. Lipschutz, a fictional character in the animated TV series: Rugrats

== See also ==
- Lipshutz
