= District Council of Tumby Bay =

Coordinates: 34°22′30″S 136°06′10″E

- Local government area
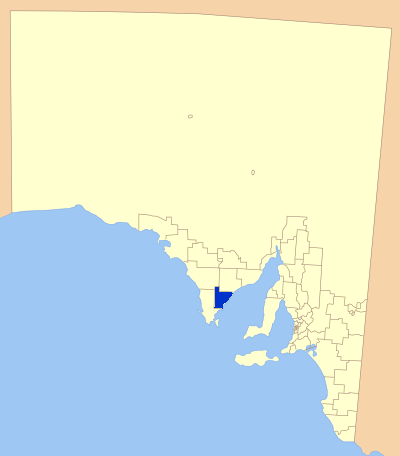
- Location of Tumby Bay District Council in blue

- Interactive map of District Council of Tumby Bay
- Country: Australia
- State: South Australia
- Region: Eyre Western
- Established: 1906
- Council seat: Tumby Bay

Government
  - Mayor: Geoff Churchett
  - State electorate: Flinders
  - Federal division: Grey

Area
  - Total: 2,615.9 km^{2} (1,010.0 sq mi)

Population
  - Total: 2,817 (LGA 2021)
- Website: District Council of Tumby Bay
LGAs around District Council of Tumby Bay
Elliston	Cleve	Cleve
Lower Eyre Peninsula	District Council of Tumby Bay	Spencer Gulf
Lower Eyre Peninsula	Lower Eyre Peninsula	Spencer Gulf

The Tumby Bay District Council is a local government area of South Australia covering an area of the North Eastern Eyre Peninsula. It was established in 1906, only six years after the town of Tumby Bay was established, when the district was severed from the former District Council of Lincoln (now the District Council of Lower Eyre Peninsula) to form the present council.

== Localities ==
The district encompasses a number of towns and localities, including Brooker, Butler, Cockaleechie, Koppio, Lipson, Moody, Port Neill, Tumby Bay, Ungarra, Yallunda Flat and part of Hincks.

== Economy ==
The District's economy relies heavily on agriculture and fishing, and to a lesser extent, tourism.

The Area has long been a tourist destination, with fishing being a major attraction. A large marina was constructed in Tumby Bay in 2001, which has allowed for easier launching of boats, as well as development of nearby areas.

== Councillors ==
Ward	Councillor	Notes
Unsubdivided	Geoff Churchett	Mayor
Unsubdivided	Julie Elliott	Deputy Mayor
Unsubdivided	Fiona Ward	
Unsubdivided	Ross Hudson	
Unsubdivided	Rick Will	
Unsubdivided	Trevor Smith	
Unsubdivided	Bruce Bayly	

== Past Councillors ==
TUMBY BAY	HUTCHISON	LIPSON
1906-1910 CW DUTTON	1957-1965 JB HUDSON	1906-1917 EJ BARRAUD
1910-1911 T BUTTERFIELD	1965-1967 FC SWAFFER	1917-1919 CM OCHTOMANN
1911-1924 J NANKIVELL	1967-1973 WG RICHARDS	1919-1923 O TREASURE
1924-1934 LA BROCK	1973-1989 CNR LAWRIE	1923-1925 AB WISHART
1934-1946 CA DARLING		1925-1931 CM OCTOMAN
1946-1950 TR GARDNER		1935-1955 WOE TREASURE
1950-1952 FM LODGE		1955-1963 AW CARR
1952-1957 AS TROWBRIDGE		1963-1976 KH WARE
1957-1963 AR EDWARDES		1976-1989 HM BAILLIE
1963-1968 RT HOOD		
1968-1977 RV PHILLIS		
1977-1989 IK FREEMAN		
1989-1997 IK FREEMAN	1989-1991 BI LAWRIE	1989-1993 HM BAILLIE
1997-2002 KA HAESE	1991-2000 D SCHRAMM	1993-2000 A THORPE
2002-2003 PG CAVE	2000-2003 RJ LAWRIE	2000-2002 AG GILES
2003-2005 MS BAKER	2003-2014 ROBERT LAWRIE	2002-2010 GJ STIRLING
2010-2014 SJ TELFER	2006-2022 RJ (BOB) LAWRIE	2006-2014 DS BAILLIE
2022- RD WILL	2023- WR HUDSON	2023- FM WARD
DIXSON	BUTLER	MOODY
1927-1928 HA FREEMAN	1906-1919 SM BAWDEN	1910-1920 NG DENNIS
1928-1932 HB TILLY	1919-1922 WJM COWLEY	1920-1922 WT ROBERTS
1932-1936 PDS COOPER	1922-1928 AH PHITZNER	1922-1926 HT PEDLER
1940-1942 SL BAWDEN	1928-1945 G YOUNG	1926-1964 JK SCHRAMM
1942-1958 J GIBBONS	1945-1948 HB TILLY	1964-1978 OR LAWRIE
1958-1964 EJ BEINKE	1948-1955 AH FREEMAN	1978-1985 MD CORNWELL
1964-1968 JR COX	1955-1968 WR PHITZNER	1985-1989 RDF PUGSLEY
1968-1970 RA FAUSER	1968-1982 CF CHILMAN	
1970-1972 GR FREEMAN	1982-1989 AN BEACH	
1972-1987 RS SCHUNKE		
1987-1989 RC MANSELL		
1989-1993 RC MANSELL	1989-1993 AN BEACH	1989-1990 BN ANDERSON
1993-2006 JE JENKINS	1993-1997 MA FIEGERT	1990-1991 FR WILLIS
2006-2014 ME MASON	1997-1998 RE HIBBLE	1991-2000 LJ CURTIS
2014-2018 RJ HETZEL	1998-2006 PG BROUGHAM	2000-2003 DM JURGS
2018-2022 S HIBBIT	2006-2010 RE WILSON	2003-2007 TJ FULTON
2023- TJ SMITH	2010-2018 IWG COLLINS	2010-2014 BROUGHAM
BROOKER	STOKES	KOPPIO
1930-1950 LE CLARKS	1906-1909 HR SIVIOUR	1906-1913 FO OLKSTON
1950-1952 HH WILLIAMS	1909-1911 Geo PROVIS	1913-1923 GB GARDNER
1952-1954 AJ McSKIMMING	1911-1921 WR BUTLER	1923-1925 AV TEAKLE
1954-1962 MT GARDNER	1921-1925 HJ BLACKER	1925-1931 GB GARDNER
1962-1976 LG NEATE	1925-1931 EM SMITH	1931-1939 EW PRICE
1976-1988 IJW PEARSON	1931-1937 CB TILBROOK	1939-1943 WR RICARDSON
1988-1989 ID GLOVER	1937-1939 PV PROVIS	1943-1959 RT BRENNAND
	1939-1941 HMT ROBERTS	1959-1969 RM CARR
	1941-1947 VE FITZGERALD	1969-1973 VH MICKAN
	1947-1957 WV ROEDIGER	1973-1983 VP PEDLAR
	1957-1971 EF WAIT	1983-1988 WR HUDSON
	1971-1981 B FITZGERALD	1988-1989 DA DUNN
	1981-1989 DW LIDDICOAT	
1989-1997 LD GLOVER	1989-1991 DW LIDDICOAT	1989-2006 DA DUNN
1997-2003 IJW PEARSON	1991-1995 MR TELFER	2010-2014 PM SWAFFER
2003-2006 PG CAVE	1995-1998 RA PEPWORTH	2014-2022 H ALLEN-JORDAN
2006-2010 NW PHILLIPS	1998-2003 HIBBLE	2014-2018 G STEWART
2010-2014 MR WILKSCH	2003-2006 DK LIDDICOAT	2018-2022 RJ RANDALL
2014-2021 HT KROEMER	2006-2010 L WADDELL-SMITH	2018-2023 RP TRENBERTH
2021-2022 JA ELLIOTT	2023- JA ELLIOTT	2023- 2025 CD KOTZ
		2025- BB BAYLY
BUTLER & MOODY WARDS ABOLISHED IN 1989		

== Chairmen and Mayors of Tumby Bay ==
- EJ BARRAUD – 1906-1917
- SM BAWDEN – 1917-1919
- J NANKIVELL – 1919-1924
- AB WISHART – 1924-1925
- LA BROCK – 1925-1934
- JK SCHRAMM – 1934-1964
- WR PFITZNER – 1964-1968
- KH WARE – 1968-1976
- CF CHILMAN – 1976-1982
- IJW PEARSON – 1982-1988
- CNR LAWRIE – 1988-1989
- HM BAILLIE – 1989-1993
- LD GLOVER – 1993-1997
- D SCHRAMM – 1997-2000
- IJW PEARSON – 2000-2003
- GJ STIRLING – 2003-2010
- LWG COLLINS – 2010-2014
- SJ TELFER – 2014-2022
- HL ALLEN-JORDAN – 2022-2022
- GJ CHURCHETT – 2022-
