= Lipton (surname) =

Lipton is a surname, and may refer to:

- Bruce Lipton (born 1944), American developmental biologist
- Carwood Lipton (1920–2001), US Army officer and World War II veteran portrayed in Band of Brothers (TV miniseries)
- Celia Lipton (1923–2011), British actress, singer and philanthropist
- Ellen Lipton (born 1967), American lawyer and politician
- Eric Lipton (contemporary), New York Times reporter
- James Lipton (1926–2020), American writer, poet, actor, and host of Inside the Actors Studio
- John Lipton (born 1936), American politician
- Lawrence Lipton (1898–1975), American journalist, writer, and beat poet
- Lenny Lipton (1940–2022), American author, filmmaker and stereoscopic vision system inventor
- Lew Lipton (1897–1961), American screenwriter
- Lynne Lipton (contemporary), American actress
- Marcus Lipton (1900–1978), British Labour Party politician
- Martha Lipton (1913–2006), American operatic mezzo-soprano
- Martin Lipton (born 1931), American lawyer
- Michael Lipton (1937–2023), British economist
- Peggy Lipton (1946–2019), American actress, model, and socialite
- Peter Lipton (1954–2007), American philosopher of science and epistemologist
- Richard J. Lipton (born 1946), American computer scientist
- Seymour Lipton (1903–1986), American abstract expressionist sculptor
- Sir Stuart Lipton (born 1942), British property developer
- Sydney Lipton (1905–1995), English bandleader
- Sir Thomas Lipton (1848–1931), British merchant and yachtsman; created the Lipton tea brand
- Zachary Lipton (born 1985), American jazz saxophonist, composer, and bandleader

== See also ==
- Lipton (disambiguation)
