= Lipsitz =

Lipsitz is a surname. Notable people with the surname include:

- George Lipsitz (born 1947), American Studies scholar
- Kevin Lipsitz, American competitive eater
- Robert Lipsitz (1942–2020), American bridge player
