= Port Neill =

- Town
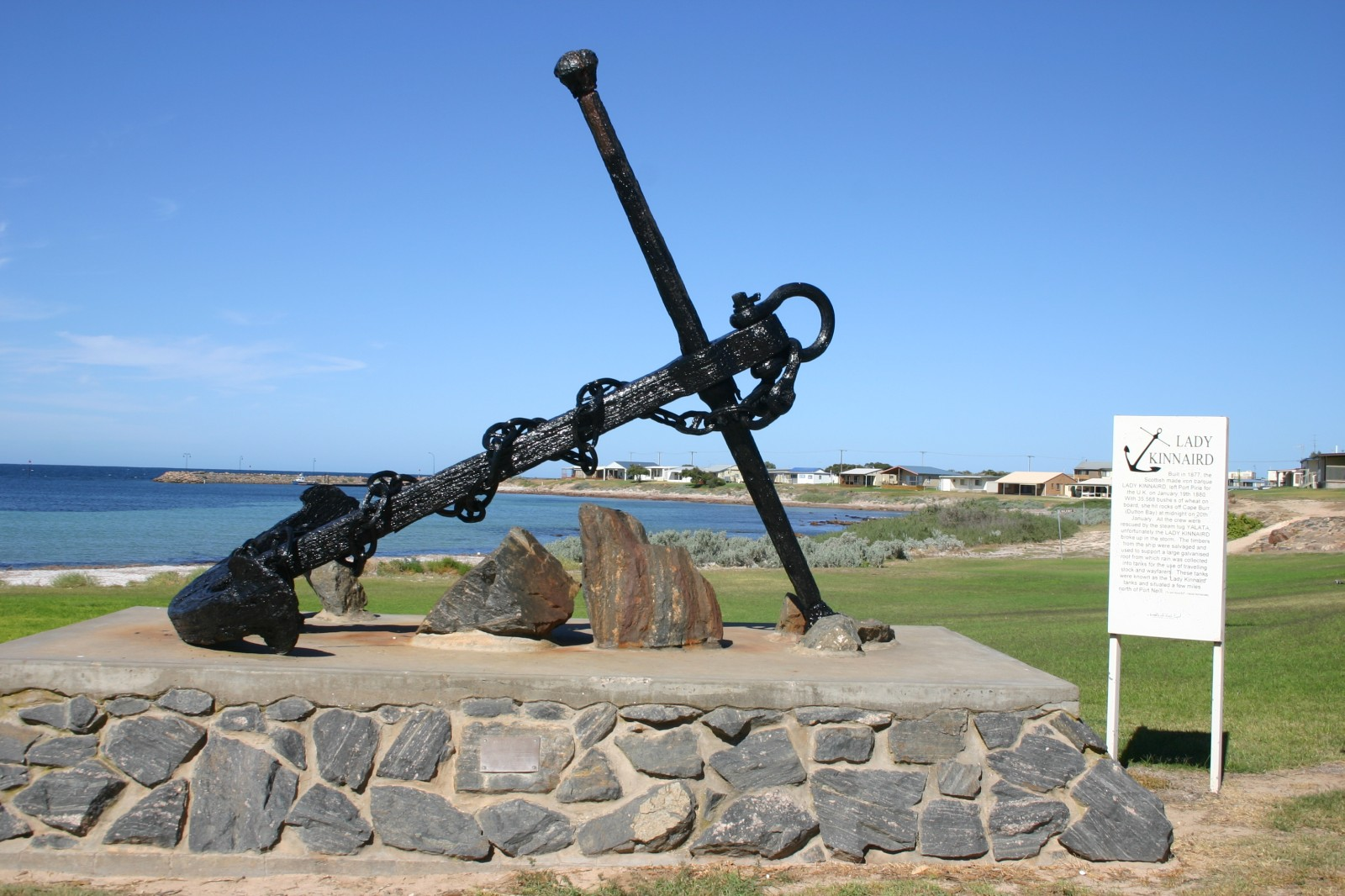
- Lady Kinnaird anchor on the foreshore at Port Neill

- Coordinates: 34°07′0″S 136°21′0″E
- Country: Australia
- State: South Australia
- Region: Eyre Western
- LGA: District Council of Tumby Bay
- Location: 227 km (141 mi) west of Adelaide; 40 km (25 mi) north east of Tumby Bay
- Established: 1909

Government
  - State electorate: Flinders
  - Federal division: Grey
- Elevation: 0 m (0 ft)

Population
  - Total: 152 (2006 census)
- Postcode: 5604
- County: Jervois
Localities around Port Neill
Wharminda	Wharminda; Verran	Arno Bay
Butler	Port Neill	Spencer Gulf
Lipson	Lipson	Spencer Gulf
- Location; Adjoining localities

Port Neill (formerly Carrow) is a small coastal town on the eastern side of the Eyre Peninsula, in South Australia about 3 km off the Lincoln Highway between the major towns of Whyalla and Port Lincoln. It is 576 km by road from Adelaide.

The town offers protected beaches for swimming, as well as providing a venue for fishing, boating, sailing, skiing or skin-diving.

== History ==
Matthew Flinders sailed past on 7 March 1802 and reported 'low front land, somewhat sandy, with raised land inland and of a barren appearance, its elevation diminishing to the northward.' The first land-based European exploration took place in April 1840, when the party of Governor Gawler, John Hill, and Thomas Burr explored the Spencer Gulf coast on horseback, they being the first Europeans to traverse the landward regions of this coast between Port Lincoln and the Middleback Ranges near Whyalla. They roughly followed the route of the present Lincoln Highway. During this expedition Gawler named Cape Burr as well as nearby Mount Hill.

The first settlers arrived in 1873 when John Tennant and his son Andrew took up land around the bay, then known as Mottled Cove.

The town was first called Carrow and was gazetted in 1903 and laid out in January 1909 by surveyor William Greig Evans. The name 'Carrow' came from an Aboriginal word relating to a soakage rock hole. Some confusion was caused by the similarity of the name to the locality of Warrow (near Coulta on south-western Eyre Peninsula) and the town was renamed Port Neill on 19 September 1940. The name of the town honours a Warden of the Marine Board, Andrew Sinclair Neill.

The first jetty was built in 1912 to ship wheat and wool from the district. It was noted in the Observer in June 1910 that settlers in the Hundred of Butler and the district adjoining Mottled Cove were 'anxiously awaiting some movement towards the long promised jetty at that port'. The settlers were suffering greater disadvantages of shipping facilities than most other parts of the west coast at this time. Once the jetty was built, shipments continued until 1970, when shipments by road to Port Lincoln's larger harbour facilities and grain silos commenced. It was noted at the time of construction that the jetty was the largest on the Eyre Peninsula.

== Geography ==
Port Neill is situated in Mottled Cove at the south end of Dutton Bay near Cape Burr on the western side of Spencer Gulf about 80 kilometres (50 mi) north east of Port Lincoln and about 40 kilometres (25 mi) north east Tumby Bay. The surrounding region of Port Neill mostly consists of agricultural land, and the coast contains a mixture of white, sandy beaches, vegetated dunes and rocky points.

In 1909, surveyor William Grieg Evans noted that the area was covered with "low mallee teatree and bushes... light sandy loam red clay over limestone". He described it as "slightly undulating country", which meant the land had a wavelike appearance and form.

=== Geology ===
The rocks in Port Neill are of great interest to geologists, as they give prime examples of the Kalinjala Mylonite Zone, and an idea of the processes that occurred 20 km below the surface. Some of the oldest rocks date back to 1850 million years ago, and comprise granite gneisses, amphibolites, and rocks known as pegmatite.

== Economy ==
The Port Neill jetty and goods shed indicate the town's past as a once busy seaport. Today, much of Port Neill's economy] is derived from the surrounding agricultural] districts, with cereal crops and sheep prominently farmed.

Like many coastal towns of the Eyre Peninsula, Port Neill is a well established tourist destination, with town numbers swelling during summer holidays. As well as its history, Port Neill offers a laid back country atmosphere and a number of recreational activities.

Fishing is popular from the town jetty, the surrounding beaches and from boats, with boat launching facilities available. A number of other watersports including swimming and snorkelling are on offer in the clean sandy bay.

The town has a number of accommodation options, including the Port Neill Hotel, caravan park and various holiday flats and apartments.

== Community ==
=== Demographics ===
At the time of the 2006 census, Port Neill's population in the town proper was 152, with another 209 in the surrounding district. The vast majority were Australian born and of those that immigrated, all came from the United Kingdom. The most common responses for religious affiliation in the town was Uniting Church 20.4%, Anglican 16.4%, No Religion 15.8%, Catholic 13.2% and Christian, nfd 6.6%.

=== Facilities ===
Port Neill has several sporting clubs and recreational facilities, including an oval, tennis and basketball courts, bowling green and golf course, skatepark and a playground on the foreshore. The Lady Kinnaird anchor and a World War II cannon are situated on the foreshore lawns which provide an ideal family picnic spot.

In its past the early established town boasted three general stores, butcher's, saddler's, blacksmith's and baker's shops. Today the town currently provides a general store and post office, hotel and pub, and several tourism-based shops. Various walking trails, parks and lookouts are also dotted throughout the area.

A small primary school services the town, which caters from Reception to Year 7.

== Gallery ==
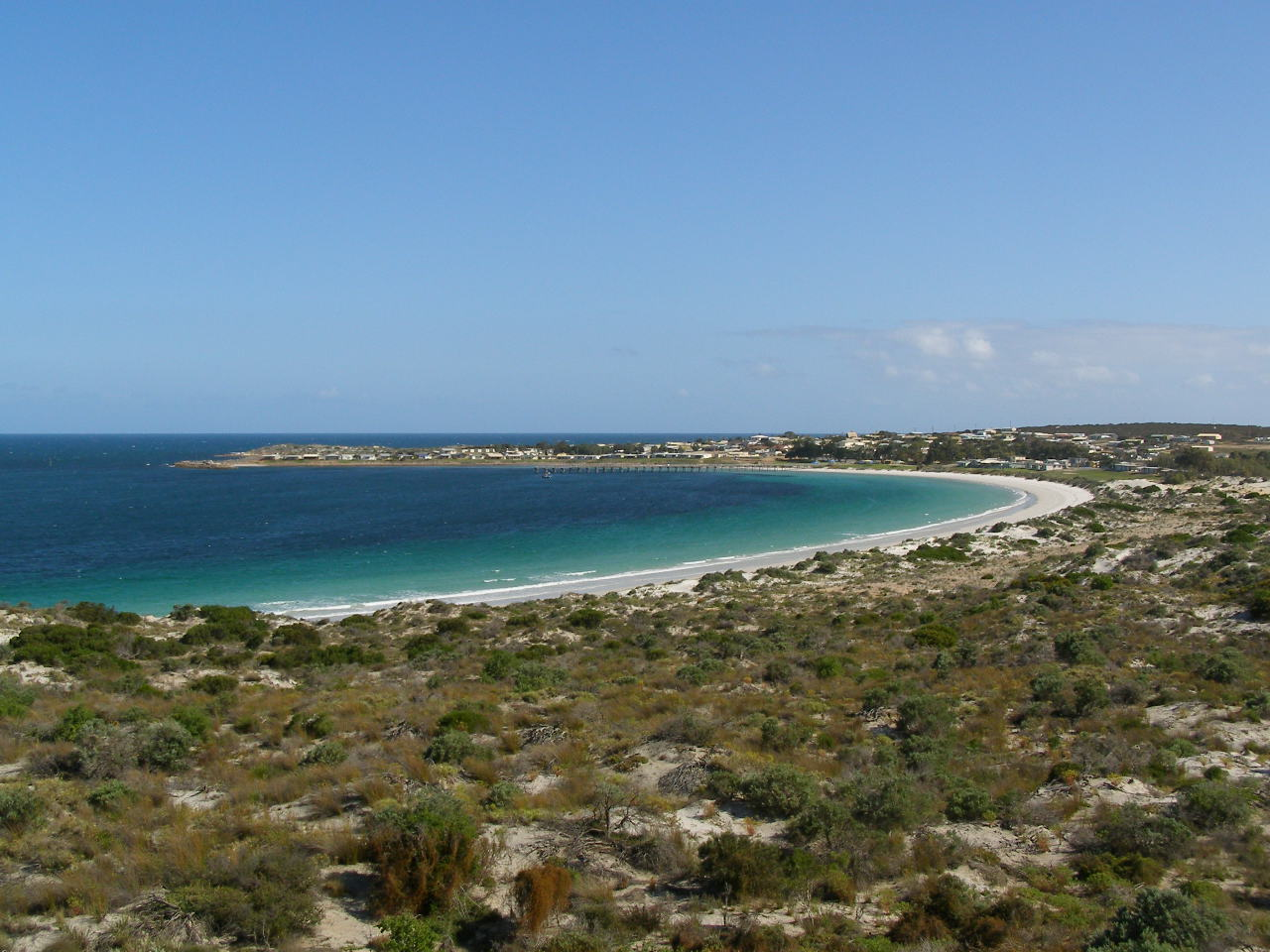
Looking across to Port Neill

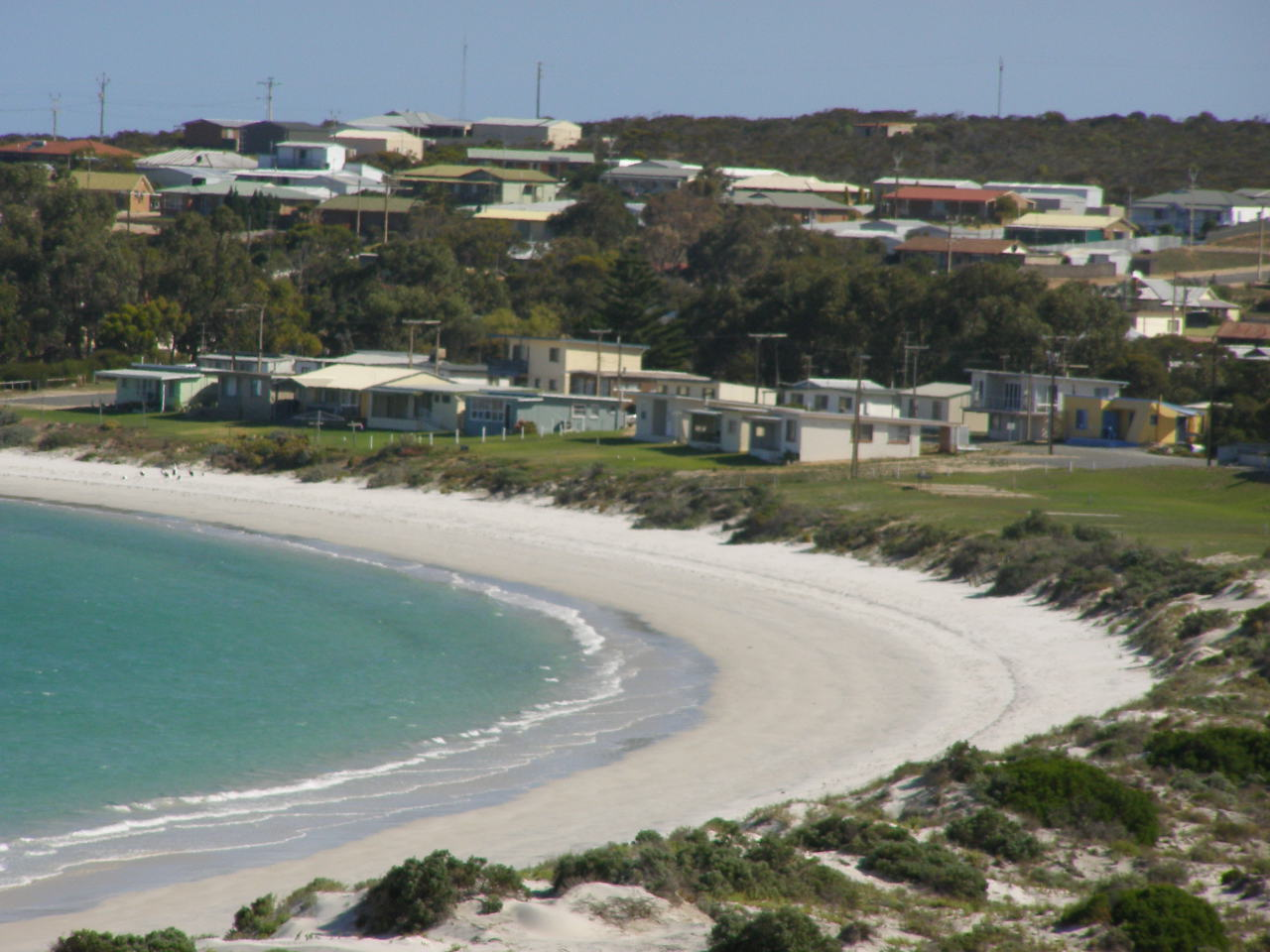
Beach, Port Neill

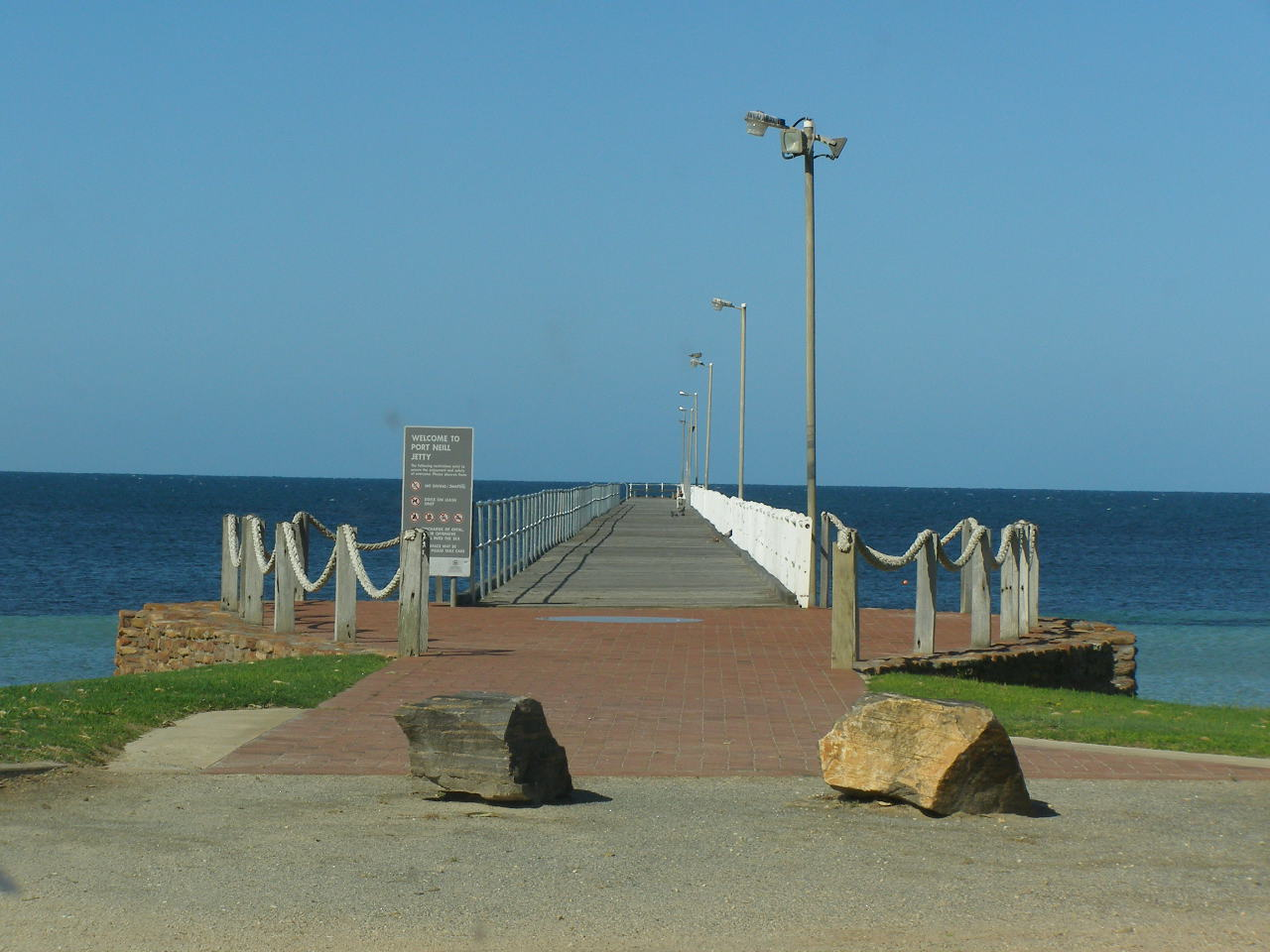
Jetty, Port Neill
