= Lipson Island Conservation Park =

Protected area in South Australia

- IUCN category III (natural monument or feature)
- Location within South Australia
- Location: South Australia
- Nearest city: Lipson.
- Coordinates: 34°15′50″S 136°15′57″E
- Area: 8 ha (20 acres)
- Established: 16 March 1967
- Governing body: Department for Environment and Water

Lipson Island Conservation Park is a protected area in the Australian state of South Australia associated with Lipson Island in Spencer Gulf about 12 kilometres (7.5 miles) north northeast of Lipson.

The land that now comprises the conservation park previously received statutory protection in March 1967 as a fauna conservation reserve declared under the Crown Lands Act 1929-1966 and was re-proclaimed in 1972 under the National Parks and Wildlife Act 1972 as a conservation park.

The area under protection is considered significant because it is "a small island supporting breeding colonies of fairy penguins, black-faced cormorants, sooty oystercatchers, crested terns, pacific gulls and silver gulls".

The conservation park is classified as an IUCN Category III protected area.
