= Centrex Metals =

Australian mining company

- Traded as: ASX: CXM
- Industry: Agriculture; Mining
- Founded: 2001
- Headquarters: Adelaide, Australia
- Key people: Peter Hunt (Chairman); Robert Mencel (Managing Director)
- Website: www.centrexmetals.com.au

Centrex Metals Limited is an Australian resources exploration and mining company.

== History ==
Founded in 2001, Centrex Metals was listed on the Australian Securities Exchange in 2006 with the aim of developing several iron ore projects on the Eyre Peninsula, South Australia. It also had interests in Western Australia and Queensland.

Subsequently, the company sold off its South Australian assets, dissolved its joint ventures, and repositioned itself to be an organic fertiliser producer. The proposed site of Port Spencer, the company's original intended export point for Eyre Peninsula iron ore, was sold to prospective grain exporters, Free Eyre in 2019. The sale included the port's development plans and approvals which have since been amended and optimised for grain handling by Peninsula Ports.

Centrex Metals acquired the Oxley potassium project, 125 kilometres (78 miles) south-east of the port of Geraldton, Western Australia in 2015, and the Ardmore phosphate rock project, 130 kilometres (81 miles) south of Mount Isa, Queensland, in 2017.

The Ardmore project is the company's principal operation. It is based on a shallow, high-grade phosphate deposit. As of 2021, the company had begun small-scale production, planning to ramp up significantly by the end of 2024.

The project at Oxley is based on a 32 kilometres (20 miles) globally rare ultrapotassic lava flow, dominantly composed of potassium feldspar. As of 2021, the company was seeking a partner to advance it to the next stage.

In 2016, the company also reported active exploration for zinc and copper near Goulburn in the Lachlan Fold Belt of New South Wales. In 2019 it described the project as "drill-ready".
