= Ungarra, South Australia =

Ungarra is a small swamp town located on the Eyre Peninsula, South Australia about 595kms from the state's capital, Adelaide and around 80 kilometres (50 mi) north of Port Lincoln. At the 2021 census, Ungarra had a population of 156. This has decreased since the 2006 census, when Ungarra is recorded to have a population of 241.

The name 'Ungarra' is derived from a nearby waterhole of the same name which is located just to the south of the township. It has a Mediterranean climate and receives on average just over 400mm of rainfall every year.

== Overview ==
The traditional custodians of the land on which Ungarra stands are the Nawu people.

Settlers started farming the area in the early 1900s as the Eyre Peninsula Railway from Port Lincoln reached Ungarra in 1909. This provided an incentive for the clearing of what was generally mallee/Melaleuca mix of native vegetation for the growing of wheat. This railway is still in operation and the branchline extended to Buckleboo but now is only operational to Kimba. An important local historic location in the nearby Moody Rock and Tanks where water was collected from a natural outcropping of granite and stored in a large tank for the required water for steam trains. This site is located within the Moody Tank Conservation Park. Moody Rocks Water Tank is listed on the South Australian Heritage Register.

The Ungarra Memorial Park is located at the southern entrance to the township, containing an old windmill as a memorial to the early colonial settlers of the area. In its heyday, Ungarra sported a bank, a bakery, a school up to year 10, and general store and two churches. While the buildings for many of these enterprises still stand, only the school (R-7) and one of the churches is still in operation. The former bank is now located at the Koppio Smithy Museum at Koppio. The agricultural production around the area has expanded from the original wheat and now includes barley, lupins, faba beans, field peas and canola. There are also livestock industries, particularly sheep-based.

The town has a number of facilities, including sporting grounds and a primary school as well as a lawn bowling green and soldier memorial hall. The school celebrated its centenary in 2014. The part-time Ungarra Community Cafe opened in 2015 as a local hub, selling coffee and local fresh produce, and donating some proceeds to local charities and overseas missions. The cafe operates out of the former general store building, which had previously been closed for eight years. The town is part of a popular tourist drive that can be done from Tumby Bay, with no camping or accommodation available within the town. Other conveniences include public toilets and payphone. The town also has clearly visible grain silos operated by Viterra which while being quiet for most of the year spring into life in the November–December period each year.

== Transport ==
While having a number of unsealed roads running into Ungarra, it is connected to Lipson and the Lincoln Highway via a sealed all-weather road, the sealing of which was only completed in 2004.

Ungarra was served by two freight-only stations of the 1,067 mm (3 ft 6 in) gauge Eyre Peninsula Railway - one is called Moody and the other is called Ungarra. A 27 kilometres (17 mi) branchline is proposed to Ungarra with the proposed iron ore port of Sheep Hill which is 20 kilometres (12 mi) northeast of Tumby Bay.

== Governance ==
Ungarra is located within the federal Division of Grey, the state electoral district of Flinders and the local government area of the District Council of Tumby Bay.
