= Tumby Bay, South Australia =

Tumby Bay
- Town
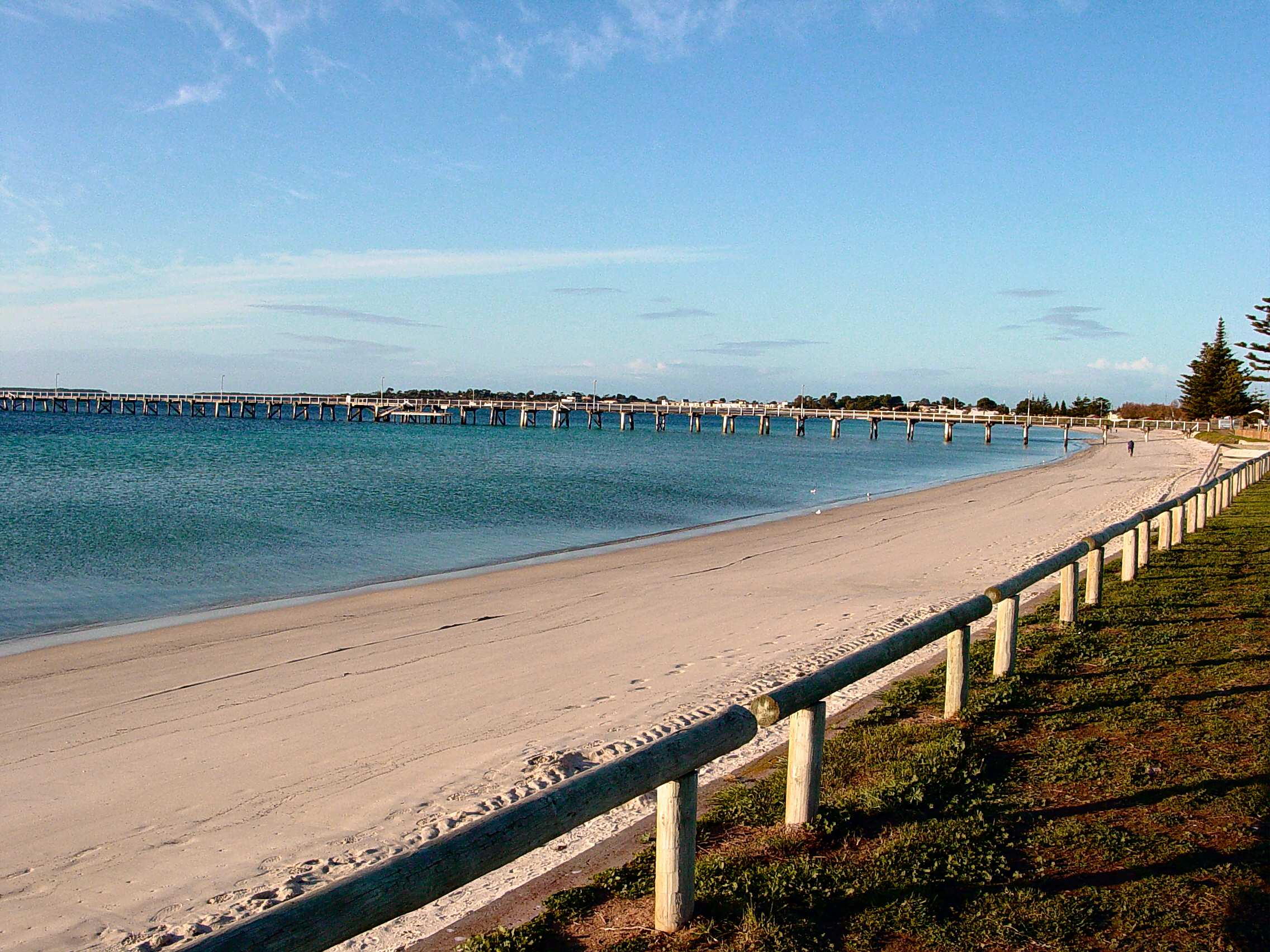
- View of the Tumby Bay jetty

- Coordinates: 34°22′S 136°06′E
- Country: Australia
- State: South Australia
- LGA: District Council of Tumby Bay
- Location: 45 km (28 mi) North of Port Lincoln
- Established: 1900; 126 years ago

Government
  - State electorate: Flinders
  - Federal division: Grey
- Elevation: 0 m (0 ft)

Population
  - Total: 1,511 (UCL 2021)
- Postcode: 5605
- Mean max temp: 22 °C (72 °F)
- Mean min temp: 14 °C (57 °F)
- Annual rainfall: 330.2 mm (13.00 in)
Localities around Tumby Bay
Ungarra	Ungarra; Lipson	Lipson Cove
Yallunda Flat; Koppio	Tumby Bay	Spencer Gulf
Whites River	Whites River; Spencer Gulf	Spencer Gulf

Tumby Bay is a coastal town situated on the Spencer Gulf, on the eastern coast of Eyre Peninsula in South Australia, 45 kilometres (28 mi) north of Port Lincoln. The town of Tumby Bay is the major population centre of the District Council of Tumby Bay, and the centre of an agricultural district farming cereal crops and sheep, as well as having established fishing and tourism industries.

== History ==
The Barngarla nation has long standing connections and are acknowledged as the traditional custodians of the area. The Nauo people also share a deep cultural and historical connection to this region.

The bay was first explored and given the name Tumby Bay by Matthew Flinders in 1802, after a parish in Lincolnshire, England. In 1840 Governor Gawler renamed the bay Harvey('s) Bay after one other district's early settlers. Then on 15 November 1900 the town of Tumby was proclaimed by Governor Tennyson, and the name of the bay itself reverted to Tumby Bay. On 14 June 1984 the town officially became known as Tumby Bay.

The earliest settlers to the district arrived in the 1840s, and farmed the area with wheat and sheep predominantly. The town soon grew into an important grain storage and loading point, with a jetty constructed in 1874, only the second to be built on the Eyre Peninsula. This provided a much needed outlet for the copper ore which was coming from the Burrowing Mine. The original jetty was taken down in 1999 due to safety concerns, but the other newer jetty is still in use.

The town's first school was opened in 1881 as 'Tumby', and the district's first hospital opened in 1913.

Tumby Bay hosted the popular event Triple J's One Night Stand on 2 April 2011, featuring the bands Birds of Tokyo, Art vs. Science and The Jezabels and locally "Unearthed" musician Joshy Willo. The town's population swelled from 1,000 to over 12,000 for the event.

=== Heritage listings ===
Tumby Bay has a number of places listed on the South Australian Heritage Register, including:

- The historic Tumby Bay Hotel on North Terrace
- The Bratten Plough Memorial on the foreshore
- The War Memorial on the foreshore
- Excell Blacksmith and Engineering Workshop Museum on Barraud Street
- The Seabreeze Hotel on Mortlock Street
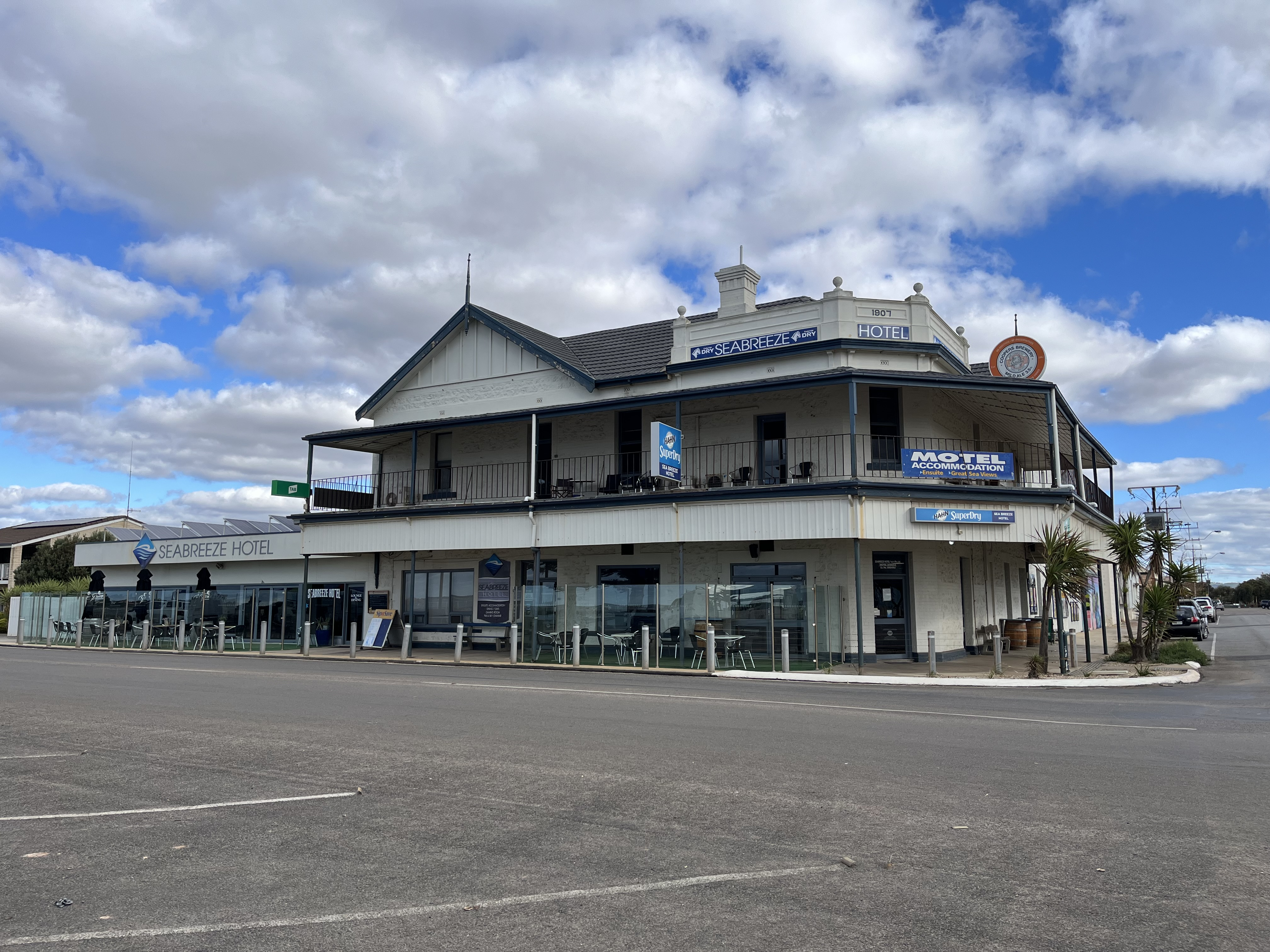
Heritage listed Seabreeze Hotel, Tumby Bay 2024

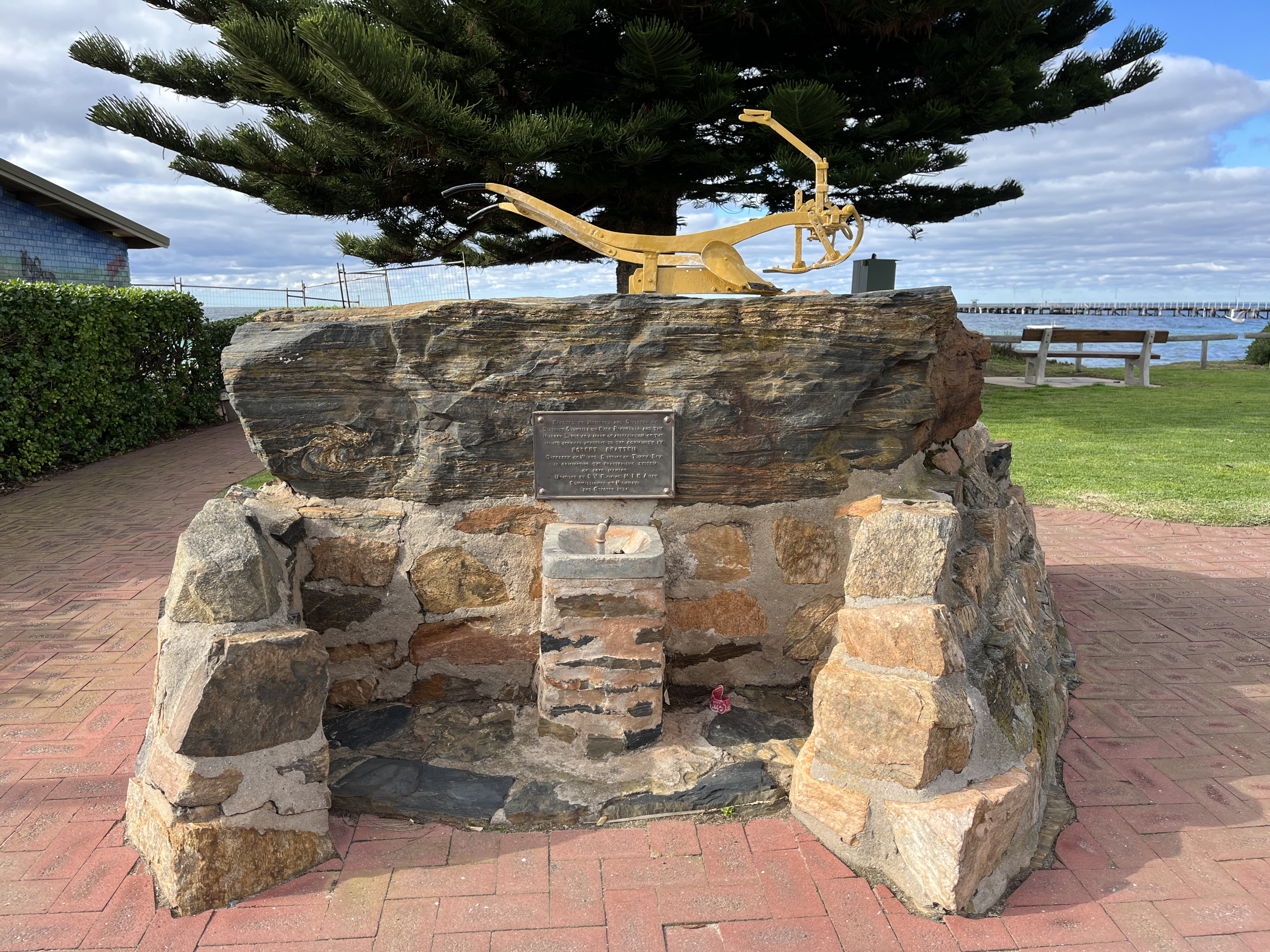
Heritage listed Bratten Plough, Tumby Bay 2024

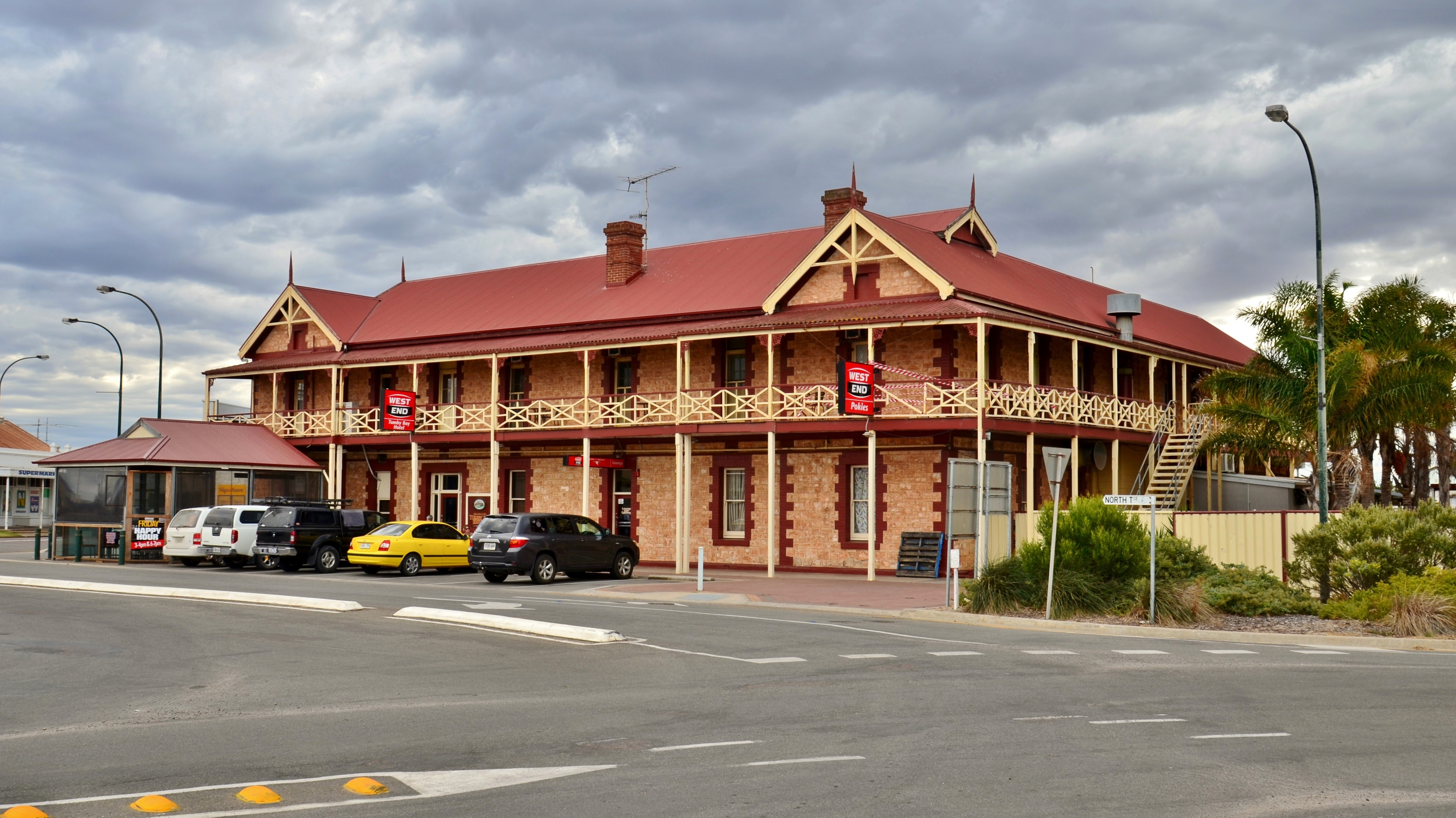
Heritage listed Tumby Bay Hotel 2017

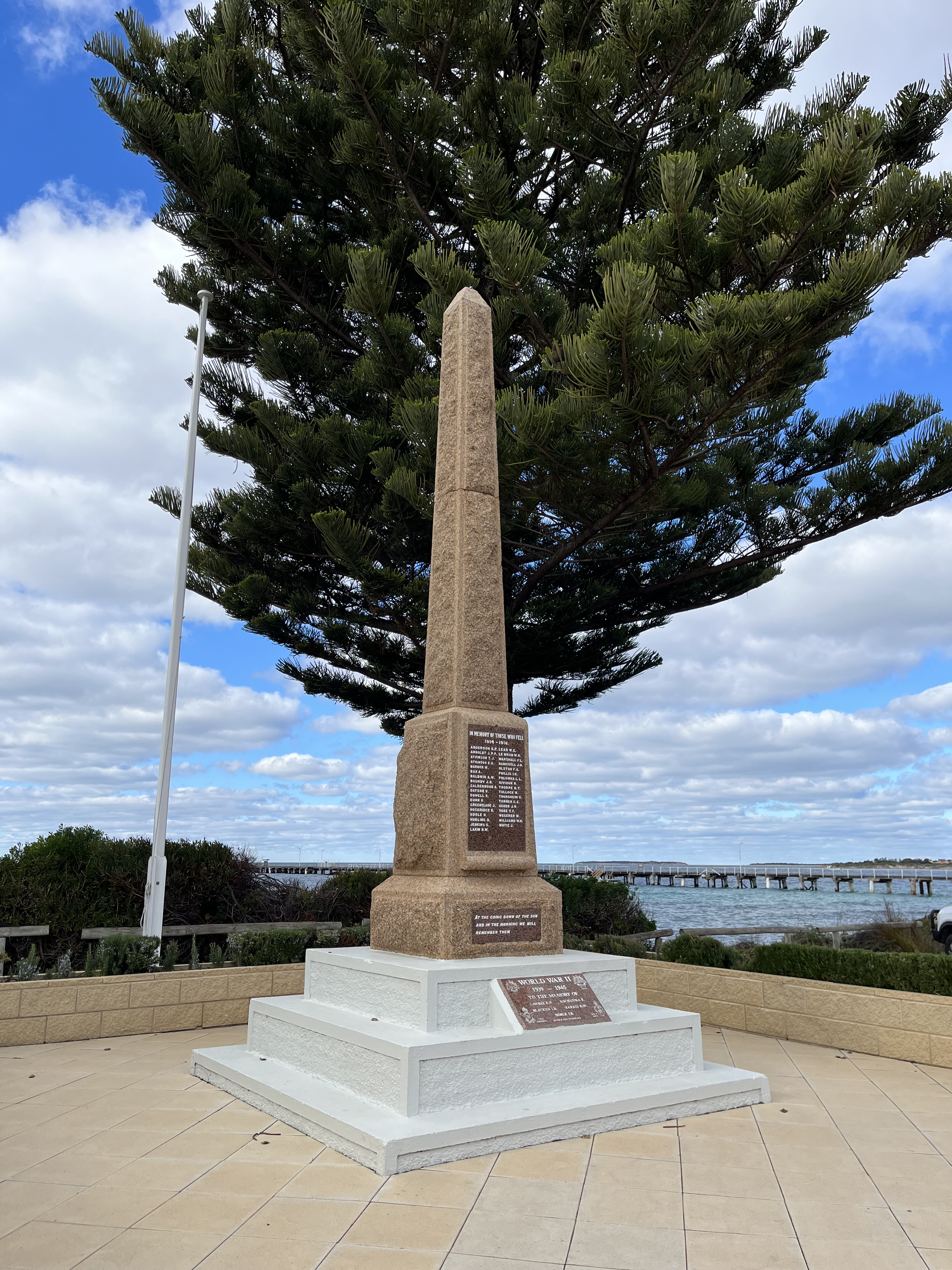
Heritage listed Soldiers Memorial on the foreshore in Tumby Bay

== Geography ==
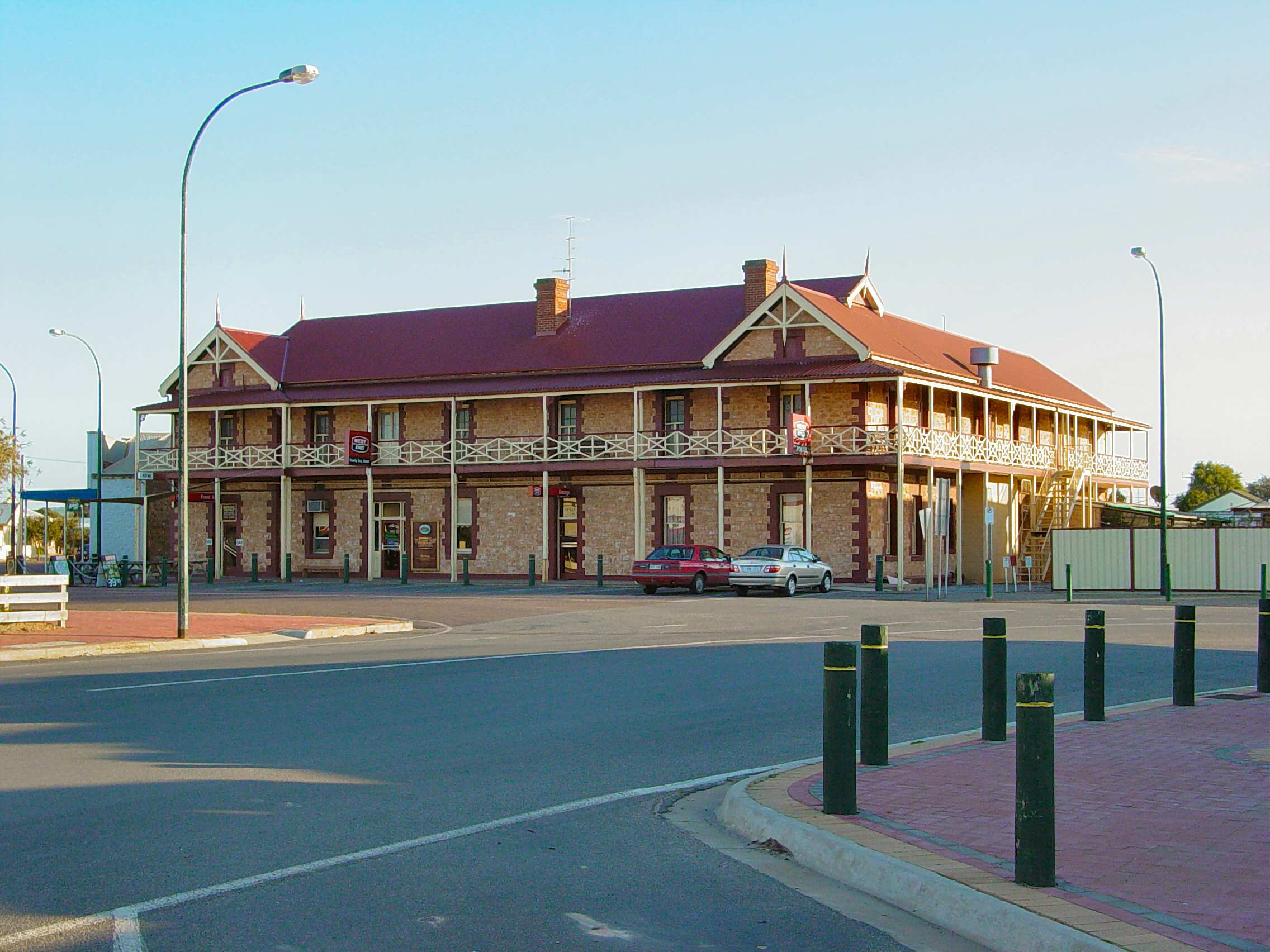
The Tumby Bay hotel

Tumby Bay lies on the large, sheltered bay of the same name on the western side of Spencer Gulf. Much of the land surrounding Tumby Bay is used for agriculture. The coast is predominantly white, sandy beaches, on which the town itself is situated, as well as towering cliffs to the south.

Inside the bay, Tumby Island is the only island but further offshore lie the Sir Joseph Banks Group, a small archipelago that is easily accessed by boat from Tumby Bay.

Like much of coastal South Australia, Tumby Bay experiences a Mediterranean climate with warm to hot summers and moderately wet winters.

== Economy ==
Since it was first settled, Tumby Bay has predominantly been an agriculturally driven town, with cereal crops, sheep and beef commonly farmed. As with many towns on the Eyre Peninsula, Tumby Bay also has a well-established professional fishing industry.

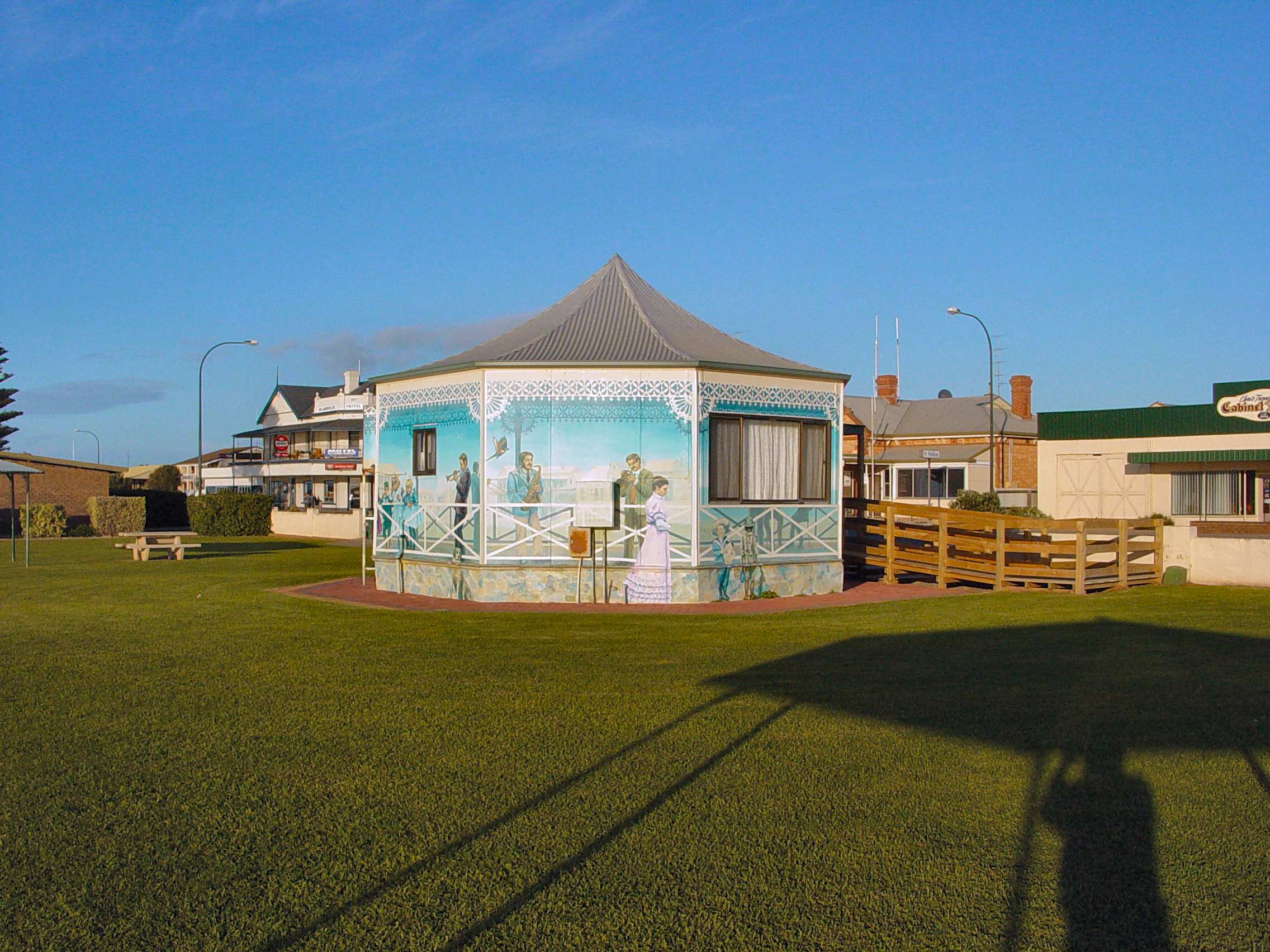
Tumby Bay Foreshore Park with mural

=== Tourism ===
Tumby Bay is a popular holiday destination during the summer months. One of the major drawcards to the area is its fishing, with a wide array of fish species available, including King George Whiting and Snapper. Up until late 2022 fishing could be enjoyed from the town jetty, but the jetty is now closed indefinitely for repairs. Fishing from surrounding beach and rock areas, as well as from a boat, is possible and allows access to the Sir Joseph Banks Group. In 2001, a marina was constructed to allow easy all weather boat launching for a range of boat sizes, as well as opening up new real estate options.

The safe, calm waters and the white sand of the bay lend themselves to a variety of watersports including swimming, snorkelling, scuba diving and water skiing for those with access to a boat. The town has a caravan park and a number of hotels and apartments offering tourist accommodation. The township affords easy access to a variety of facilities and shops.

==== Scuba diving ====
The ecological communities on and around the pylons supporting the Tumby Bay jetty make for an interesting and easy shore dive. Visiting divers must bring their own equipment, as no dive shop exists in the town. Alternatively, equipment can be hired from dive shops in Port Lincoln (45 km south-west) or Whyalla (221 km north-east).

== Community ==
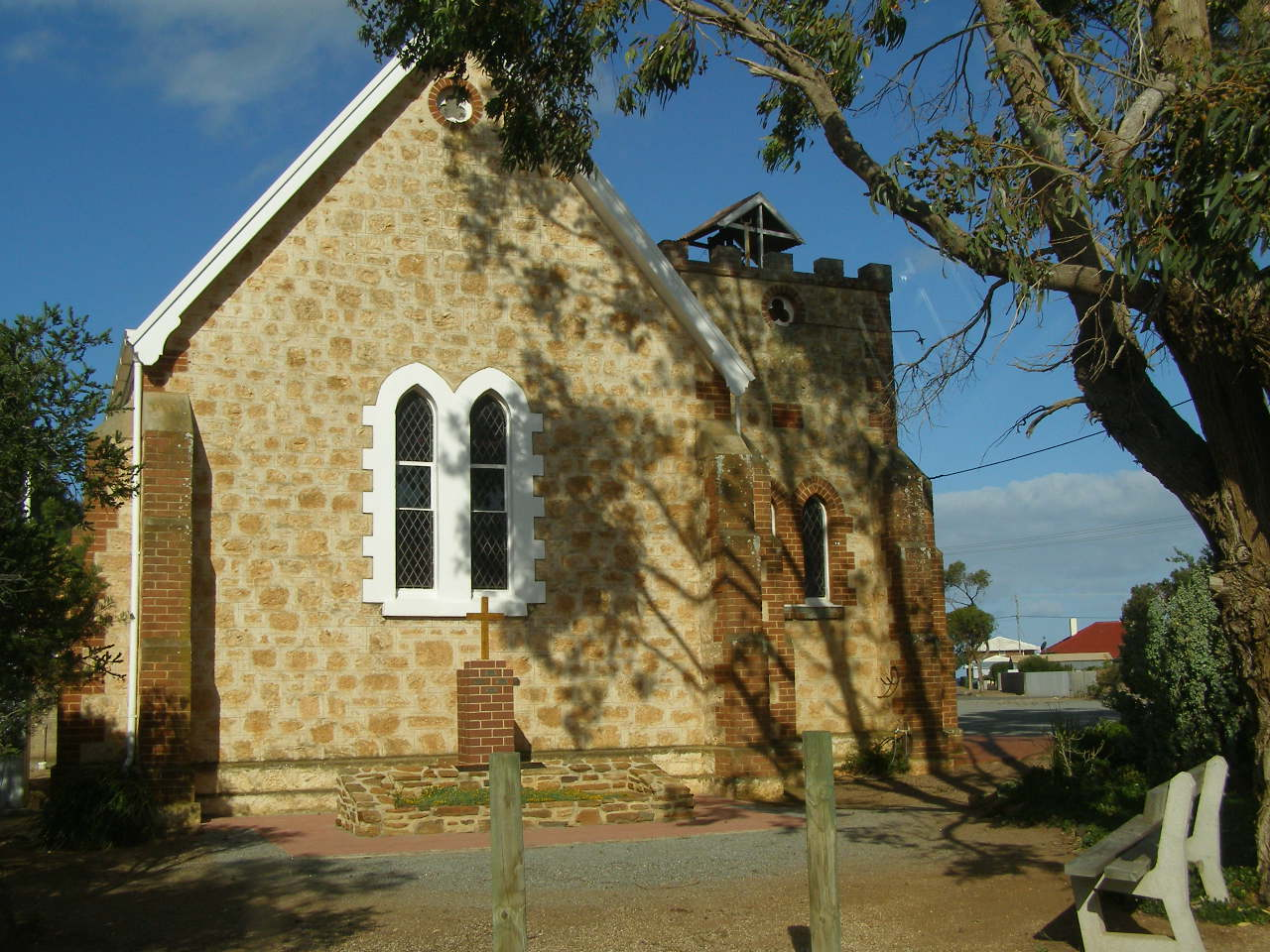
Anglican church, Tumby Bay

There are a number of churches in the town, including Anglican, Uniting, Church of Christ and Lutheran Churches. There are also a large number of sporting groups in the town, including football, cricket, netball, basketball, tennis, bowls and golf clubs, with most of the clubs competing in local leagues.

The Tumby Bay Area School provides education for students from Reception through to Year 12. A public library is located on the school grounds. A hospital is also in place to serve the health needs of the town.

The region's history is celebrated by a National Trust Museum which is staffed by volunteers.

Social historian and Tumby Bay resident Eric Kotz has also published two books about life in the region.

Community worker Janette Octoman MBE JP lived here. She tried to be elected when it was a man's job, but she led the state's Country Women's Association. The local council planted an avenue in her name.

== Media ==
The town was briefly the home to a newspaper, the Western People and Tumby Bay Times (19 June – 3 July 1912), which was printed locally by Walter Augustine Wade.

== Government ==
Tumby Bay is encompassed in the District Council of Tumby Bay local government area with the current mayor being Geoff Churchett. The town is also incorporated in the South Australian House of Assembly electoral district of Flinders and the Australian House of Representatives Division of Grey.

== Transport ==
Tumby Bay is normally reached by private car via the Lincoln Highway that runs along the east coastline of the Eyre Peninsula. Although the town does have a sealed airfield, it is not usually used for private flights, but for the Royal Flying Doctor Service and crop spraying aircraft.

As at April 2023, the town is serviced three times per week by Stateliner coach services from Port Lincoln to Adelaide.

=== Port and Rail ===
Land has been purchased 20 kilometres (12 mi) north east of Tumby Bay for the purposes of developing a bulk commodities export port. The site has been referred to as Sheep Hill, and the project now bears the name of Port Spencer. Centrex Metals is the project proponent. The site is located immediately north of Lipson Cove. The proposed port (if approved) will be capable of loading Capesize ships (either directly or by transshipment) for export of iron ore and potentially, grain. The port will be completed by 2023.

A potential rail connection to the Eyre Peninsula Railway at Ungarra, 27 kilometres (17 mi) away, has been discarded in preference for a slurry pipeline for iron ore transport.
