= County of Jervois =

Jervois
- Cadastral division
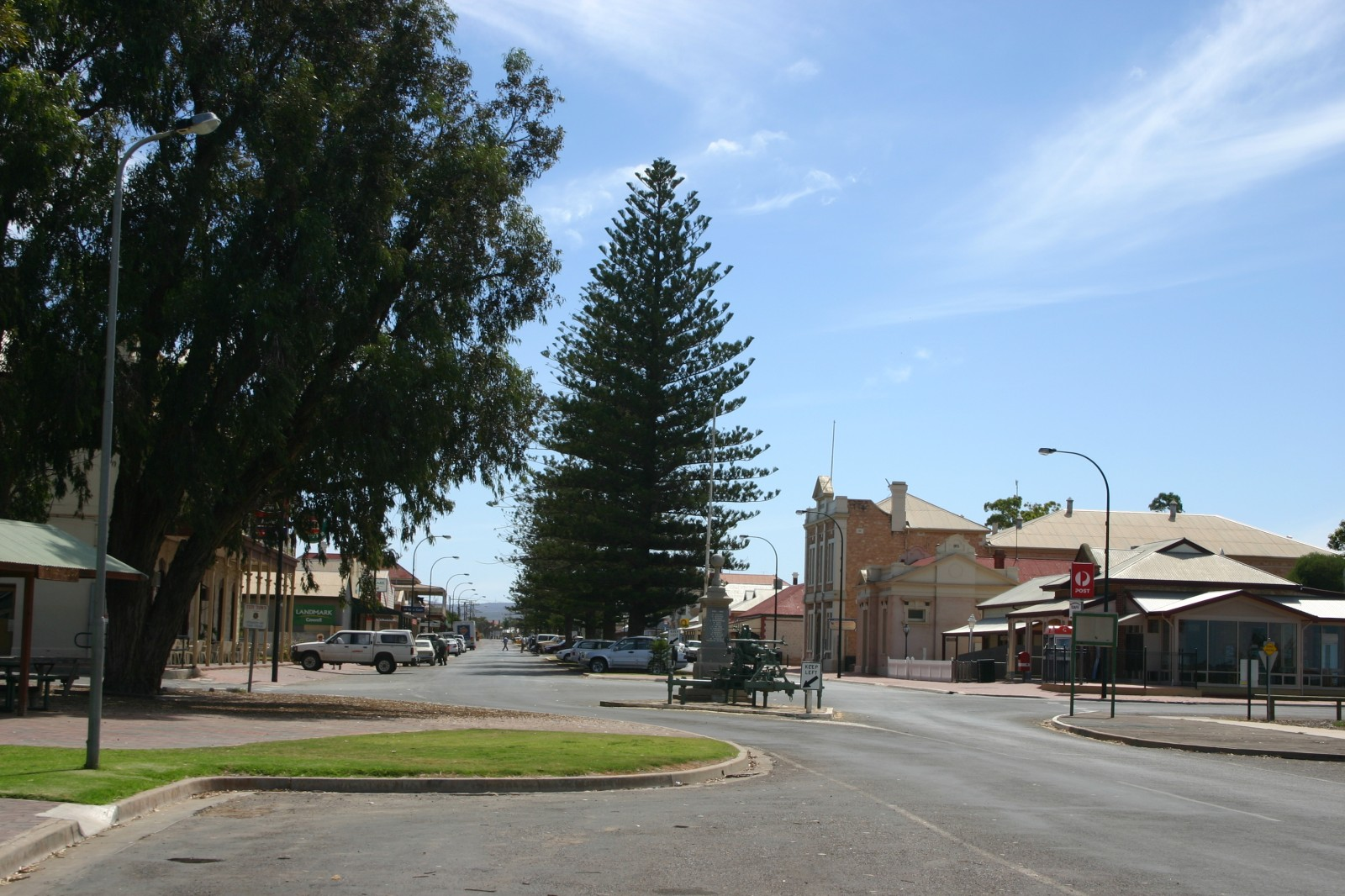
- The main street of Cowell in 2006

- Coordinates: 33.696620°S 136.411470°E
- Country: Australia
- State: South Australia
- Region: Eyre Western
- LGA(s): Cleve Elliston (part) Franklin Harbour Tumby Bay (part)
- Established: 1878

Area
  - Total: 9,600 km^{2} (3,700 sq mi)
Lands administrative divisions around Jervois
Le Hunte	Le Hunte; Buxton; York	Spencer Gulf
Musgrave	Jervois	Spencer Gulf
Flinders	Flinders	Spencer Gulf
- Coordinates; Adjoining counties

The County of Jervois is a cadastral unit in the Australian state of South Australia that covers land on the east coast of the Eyre Peninsula. It was proclaimed on 24 January 1878 and named after William Jervois, the Governor of South Australia from October 1877 to January 1883.

== Description ==
The county covers the part of the east coast of the Eyre Peninsula overlooking the Spencer Gulf from Murninnie Beach in the north and Cape Hardy in the south, and which extends inland from the coastline for a distance of about 150 kilometres (93 mi) in the north, and about 50 kilometres (31 mi) in the south. It is bounded by the counties of Le Hunte, Buxton and York to the north (from west to east), by the County of Musgrave to the west and by the County of Flinders to the south.

The county includes the towns of Cowell, Arno Bay, Port Neill, Darke Peak, and Rudall.

The Lincoln Highway passes along the coastline of the county from the north-east to the south-west, and the Birdseye Highway passes through the county in an east-west direction from Cowell in the east to Lock in the adjoining county of Musgrave.

The Cummins to Kimba line of the Eyre Peninsula Railway passes through the county, entering at its south-west corner, passing through the hundreds of Brooker and Moody in an east-west direction, before changing to a south-north alignment that passes through the hundreds of Butler, Verran, Rudall, Smeaton and Pascoe.

The principal land use is primary industry, which is represented by broadacre farming of wheat and livestock, the mining of jade, and aquaculture at Arno Bay and in Franklin Harbor on the coast of Spencer Gulf. Uncleared land in the county’s north-west corner and its south-west is protected respectively as the Hambidge and Hincks Wilderness Protection Areas, which occupy a total area of 1,045.49 square kilometres (403.67 sq mi). Other protected areas within the county include the following conservation parks - Carappee Hill, Darke Range, Franklin Harbor, Heggaton, Middlecamp Hills, Moody Tank, Munyaroo, Rudall, Sheoak Hill, The Plug Range, Verran Tanks, Wharminda, and Yeldulknie.

The county incorporates the eastern part of the District Council of Elliston in the west, the District Council of Cleve in its centre, the District Council of Franklin Harbour on the coastline with Spencer Gulf, and the northern part of the District Council of Tumby Bay in the south.

The county was named after Governor Jervois, the Governor of South Australia at the time the country was proclaimed, in accordance with “a precedent which was established in 1842" when a county was named after Governor Gawler.

== Constituent hundreds ==
=== Location of hundreds ===
The county comprises 34 hundreds. The hundreds are laid out from east to west in five rows (from north to south) as follows:

- McGregor, Charleston, Glynn, James, Heggaton, Jamieson, Pascoe, Darke and Hambidge in the north-west corner of the county separated by an area of land that has not been proclaimed as one or more hundreds, all along the northern boundary of the county,
- Warren, Minbrie, Miltalie, Mangalo, Campoona, Smeaton, Boonerdo and Palkagee,
- Wilton, Playford, Hawker, Mann, Yadnarie, Rudall, Murlong and the northern half of Tooligie at the western boundary of the county,
- Boothby, Roberts, Verran, a parcel of land consisting of Hincks and land not proclaimed as a hundred, and a parcel of land consisting of the southern half of Tooligie and Nicholls at the western boundary of the county, and
- Dixson, Butler, Moody and Brooker along the southern boundary of the county.

=== Hundred of Boonerdo ===
The Hundred of Boonerdo (33°33′12″S 135°58′36″E) was proclaimed on 28 June 1928. It covers an area of 227.3 square kilometres (87.75 sq mi) and its name was derived from an Aboriginal word for “mallee scrub.” It is entirely occupied by the locality of Boonerdo.

=== Hundred of Boothby ===
The Hundred of Boothby (33°49′28″S 136°34′44″E) was proclaimed on 24 January 1878. It covers an area of 290 square kilometres (113 sq mi) and was named after Thomas Wilde Boothby, a member of the South Australian Parliament from 1873 to 1875. Its northern end is within the locality of Cleve while its southern end is in the locality of Arno Bay.

=== Hundred of Brooker ===
The Hundred of Brooker (34°03′57″S 135°51′11″E) was proclaimed on 26 November 1903. It covers an area of 290 square kilometres (113 sq mi) and was named after Thomas Henry Brooker, a member of the South Australian Parliament from 1890 to 1902. It is located entirely within the locality of Brooker.

=== Hundred of Butler ===
The Hundred of Butler (34°04′35″S 136°09′53″E) was proclaimed on 25 April 1895. It covers an area of 297 square kilometres (114.5 sq mi) and was named after Richard Butler, a former member of the South Australian Parliament. It is located mainly within the locality of Butler while its south-west corner is located in the locality of Ungarra.

=== Hundred of Campoona ===
The Hundred of Campoona (33°33′21″S 136°24′45″E) was proclaimed on 25 April 1895. It covers an area of 260 square kilometres (100 sq mi) and its name was derived from an Aboriginal word. It is located entirely within the locality of Campoona.

=== Hundred of Charleston ===
The Hundred of Charleston (33°23′47″S 137°06′13″E) was proclaimed on 12 December 1895. It covers an area of 260 square kilometres (99 sq mi) and was named after David Charleston, a former member of the South Australian Parliament. It is located entirely within the locality of Midgee.

=== Hundred of Darke ===
The Hundred of Darke (33°24′56″S 136°07′01″E) was proclaimed on 3 February 1910. It covers an area of 260 square kilometres (102 sq mi) and was named after the explorer, John Charles Darke. Most of it is located within the locality of Darke Peak with its north-eastern corner being located in the locality of Waddikee.

=== Hundred of Dixson ===
The Hundred of Dixson (34°04′27″S 136°18′26″E) was proclaimed on 26 November 1903. It covers an area of 260 square kilometres (101 sq mi) and was named after Hugh Robert Dixson, a former member of the South Australian Parliament. It is located entirely within the locality of Port Neill.

=== Hundred of Glynn ===
The Hundred of Glynn (33°23′41″S 136°56′28″E) was proclaimed on 12 December 1895. It covers an area of 260 square kilometres (100 sq mi) and was named after Patrick McMahon Glynn, a former member of the South Australian Parliament. It located entirely within the locality of Minbrie.

=== Hundred of Hambidge ===
The Hundred of Hambidge (33°24′36″S 135°50′29″E) was proclaimed on 31 October 1957. It was named after Clive M. Hambidge, a former Surveyor General of South Australia. It is located mainly in the locality of Hambidge with its south-west corner being located in Ulyerra.

=== Hundred of Hawker ===
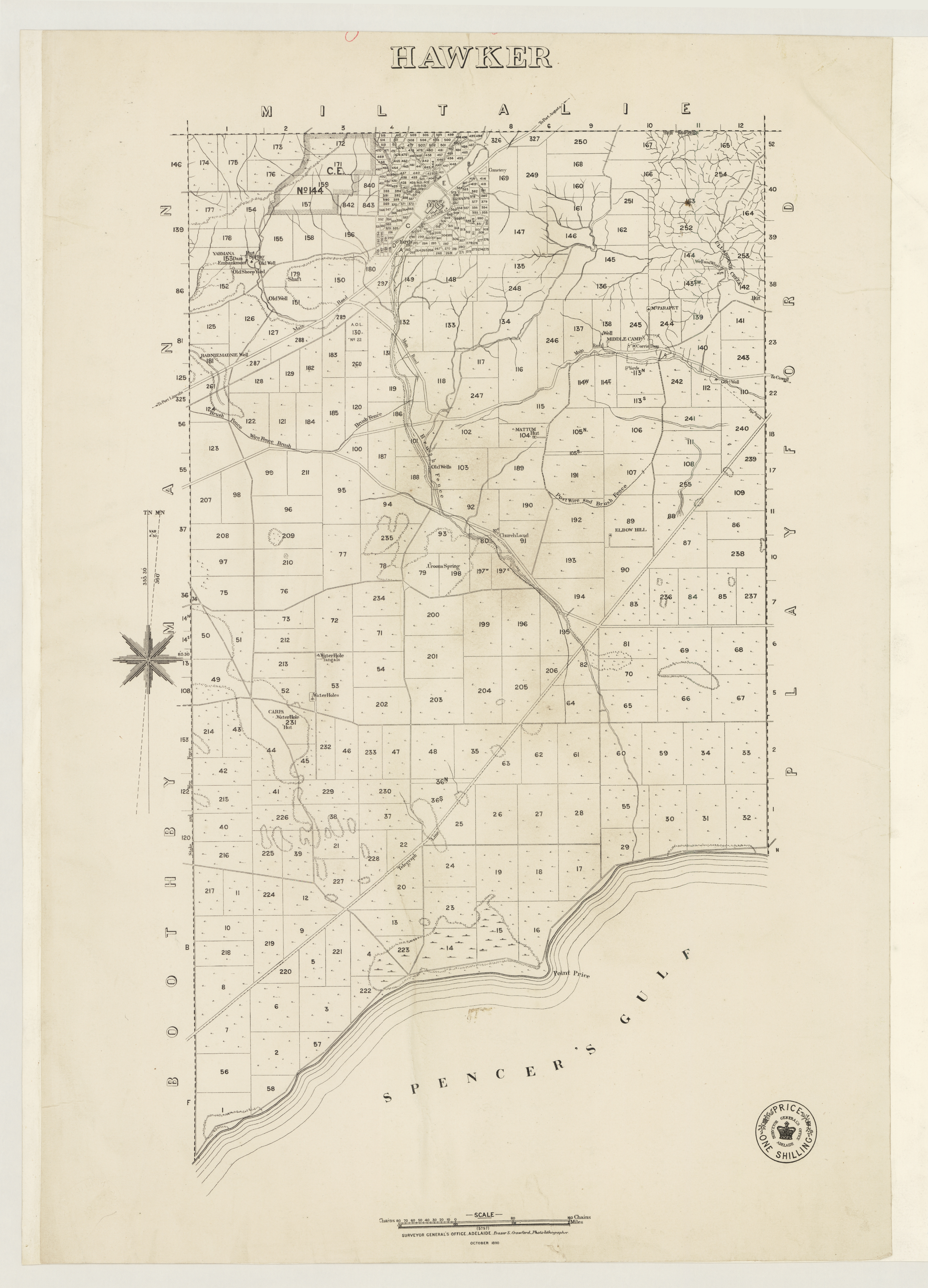
Hundred of Hawker, 1890

The Hundred of Hawker (33°43′31″S 136°45′20″E) was proclaimed on 24 January 1878. It covers an area of 380 square kilometres (147 sq mi) and was named after George Charles Hawker, a former member of the South Australian Parliament. It is located almost entirely within the locality of Cowell with a portion on the Spencer Gulf coastline being in the locality of Port Gibbon.

=== Hundred of Heggaton ===
The Hundred of Heggaton (33°23′45″S 136°34′55″E) was proclaimed on 3 February 1910. It covers an area of 250 square kilometres (98 sq mi) and was named after Percy Heggaton, a former member of the South Australian Parliament. It is located entirely within the locality of Mangalo.

=== Hundred of Hincks ===
The Hundred of Hincks (33°48′10″S 136°02′00″E) was proclaimed on 31 October 1957. It was named after Cecil Hincks, a former member of the South Australian Parliament. It is mainly located within the locality of Hincks with its north-west corner being located in the locality of Murlong.

=== Hundred of James ===
The Hundred of James (33°24′01″S 136°45′28″E) was proclaimed on 3 February 1910. It covers an area of 257.1 square kilometres (99.25 sq mi) and was named after David James, a former member of the South Australian Parliament. It is located entirely within the locality of Miltalie.

=== Hundred of Jamieson ===
The Hundred of Jamieson (33°23′58″S 136°24′38″E) was proclaimed on 3 February 1910. It covers an area of 253 square kilometres (97.5 sq mi) and was named after William Jamieson, a former member of the South Australian Parliament. Its northern side is located within the locality of Waddikee while its southern side is in the locality of Jamieson.

=== Hundred of Mangalo ===
The Hundred of Mangalo (33°32′26″S 136°34′57″E) was proclaimed on 24 January 1878. It covers an area of 260 square kilometres (100 sq mi) and its name was derived from an Aboriginal word. It is located entirely within the locality of Mangalo.

=== Hundred of Mann ===
The Hundred of Mann (33°41′43″S 136°35′10″E) was proclaimed on 24 January 1878. It covers an area of 260 square kilometres (100 sq mi) and was named after Charles Mann, a former member of the South Australian Parliament. It is located entirely within the locality of Cleve.

=== Hundred of McGregor ===
The Hundred of McGregor (33°23′49″S 137°16′55″E) was proclaimed on 12 December 1895. It covers an area of 260 square kilometres (100 sq mi) and was named after Gregor McGregor, a former member of the South Australian Parliament. It is located fully within the locality of Midgee.

=== Hundred of Miltalie ===
The Hundred of Miltalie (33°32′32″S 136°45′10″E) was proclaimed on 24 January 1878. It covers an area of 260 square kilometres (100 sq mi) and its name was derived from an Aboriginal word. It is located entirely within the locality of Miltalie.

=== Hundred of Minbrie ===
The Hundred of Minbrie (33°32′20″S 136°55′46″E) was proclaimed on 24 January 1878. It covers an area of 260 square kilometres (100 sq mi) and its name was derived from an Aboriginal word. It located almost entirely within the locality of Minbrie with exception to an intrusion of part of Miltalie on its west side.

=== Hundred of Moody ===
The Hundred of Moody (34°04′33″S 136°00′23″E) was proclaimed on 15 January 1903. It covers an area of 300 square kilometres (117 sq mi) and was named after David Moody, a former member of the South Australian Parliament. Its northern end is located within the locality of Moody while its southern end is in the locality of Ungarra.

=== Hundred of Murlong ===
The Hundred of Murlong (33°41′45″S 135°58′34″E) was proclaimed on 28 June 1928. It covers an area of 230 square kilometres (90 sq mi) and its name was derived from an Aboriginal word for “sand.” Most of it is within the locality of Murlong while its south-east corner is in the locality of Hincks.

=== Hundred of Nicholls ===
The Hundred of Nicholls (33°54′46″S 135°51′21″E) was proclaimed on 4 October 1928. It covers an area of 210 square kilometres (82 sq mi) and was named after Robert Nicholls, a member of the South Australian Parliament. Its northern end is located within the locality of Hincks while its south is in the locality of Brooker.

=== Hundred of Palkagee ===
The Hundred of Palkagee (33°33′55″S 135°50′31″E) was proclaimed on 1 October 1914. It covers an area of 230 square kilometres (90 sq mi) and its name was derived from an Aboriginal word. It is entirely located within the locality of Lock.

=== Hundred of Pascoe ===
The Hundred of Pascoe (33°25′04″S 136°15′20″E) was proclaimed on 3 February 1910. It covers an area of 260 square kilometres (101 sq mi) and was named after Thomas Pascoe, a member of the South Australian Parliament from 1900 to 1933. Its northern end is located in the locality of Waddikee while its southern end is in the locality of Darke Peak.

=== Hundred of Playford ===
The Hundred of Playford (33°40′55″S 136°55′45″E) was proclaimed on 24 January 1878. It was named after Thomas Playford, a former member of the South Australian Parliament and the first parliamentarian with that name. It located almost entirely within the locality of Cowell and includes the full extent of the embayment known as Franklin Harbor.

=== Hundred of Roberts ===
The Hundred of Roberts (33°52′38″S 136°24′24″E) was proclaimed on 5 September 1907. It covers an area of 403 square kilometres (155.5 sq mi) and was named after E Alfred Roberts, a member of the South Australian Parliament from 1898 to 1908. Most of it is located within the locality of Verran while its northern edge being in Cleve and Rudall.

=== Hundred of Rudall ===
The Hundred of Rudall (33°41′57″S 136°11′21″E) was proclaimed on 3 February 1910. It covers an area of 351 square kilometres (135.5 sq mi) and was named after Samuel Bruce Rudall, a member of the South Australian Parliament from 1906 to 1915. It is located entirely within the locality of Rudall.

=== Hundred of Smeaton ===
The Hundred of Smeaton (33°34′28″S 136°11′40″E) was proclaimed on 3/02/1910. It covers an area of 250 square kilometres (97 sq mi) and was named after Thomas Hyland Smeaton, a member of the South Australian Parliament from 1905 to 1921. It is located entirely within the locality of Kielpa.

=== Hundred of Tooligie ===
The Hundred of Tooligie (33°44′38″S 135°50′36″E) was proclaimed on 3 August 1916. It covers an area of 250 square kilometres (97 sq mi) and its name was derived from the “Native name of a hill in the vicinity.“ It is located mainly in the locality of Murdinga with its southern end being located in Tooligie and its north-western corner is located in the locality of Lock.

=== Hundred of Verran ===
The Hundred of Verran (33°52′19″S 136°14′10″E) was proclaimed on 17 September 1908. It covers an area of 403 square kilometres (155.5 sq mi) and was named after John Verran, a member of the South Australian Parliament from 1901 to 1918. It is located within the following localities from north to south - Rudall, Verran and Wharminda.

=== Hundred of Warren ===
The Hundred of Warren (33°32′22″S 137°08′49″E) was proclaimed on 12 December 1895. It covers an area of 380 square kilometres (146 sq mi) and was named after John Warren, a member of the South Australian Parliament from 1888 to 1912. It is located mainly within the locality of Mitchellville whiles its north-west and north-east corners are located within Midgee.

=== Hundred of Wilton ===
The Hundred of Wilton (33°38′45″S 137°06′32″E) was proclaimed on 18 March 1897. It covers an area of 380 square kilometres (146 sq mi) and was named after Charles Richard Wilton, a journalist. It is located almost entirely within the locality of Mitchellville with exception to its south-west corner which is in the locality of Lucky Bay.

=== Hundred of Yadnarie ===
The Hundred of Yadnarie (33°40′56″S 136°24′53″E) was proclaimed on 24 January 1878. It covers an area of 380 square kilometres (146 sq mi) and its name was derived from an Aboriginal word of unknown meaning. It is located mainly in the locality of Cleve while its western edge is located in the localities of Rudall and Campoona.

The Yadnarie School opened in 1913 and closed in 1948.

== See also ==
- Lands administrative divisions of South Australia
- Jervois (disambiguation)
