= Eucalyptus cretata =

Darke Peak mallee
- Flower buds in Carappee Hill Conservation Park

Conservation status
- Endangered (IUCN 3.1)

Scientific classification
- Kingdom: Plantae
- Clade: Tracheophytes
- Clade: Angiosperms
- Clade: Eudicots
- Clade: Rosids
- Order: Myrtales
- Family: Myrtaceae
- Genus: Eucalyptus
- Species: E. cretata

Binomial name
- Eucalyptus cretata P.J.Lang & Brooker
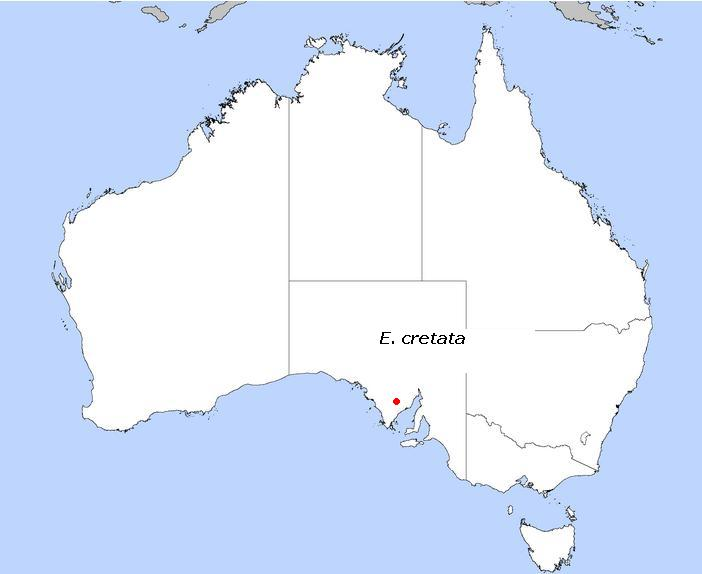
- Field distribution

Species of plant

Fruit in Carappee Hill Conservation Park

Eucalyptus cretata, commonly known as Darke Peak mallee or chalky mallee, is a species of mallee or, rarely, a small, straggly tree and is endemic to a restricted part of South Australia. It has smooth whitish and grey bark, lance-shaped adult leaves, glaucous flower buds in groups of seven, white flowers and cup-shaped to barrel-shaped or conical fruit.

== Description ==
Eucalyptus cretata is a mallee, sometimes a straggly tree, that typically grows to a height of about 4 m (13 ft) and forms a lignotuber. The bark is smooth, grey over coppery underbark, shedding in ribbons, and the branchlets are shiny red or brownish green and glaucous. Young plants and coppice regrowth have glaucous, egg-shaped to broadly lance-shaped leaves that are 45–100 mm (1.8–3.9 in) long and 25–50 mm (0.98–1.97 in) wide. Adult leaves are lance-shaped, the same colour on both sides, 78–150 mm (3.1–5.9 in) long and 13–35 mm (0.51–1.38 in) wide on a petiole 12–28 mm (0.47–1.10 in) long. The flower buds are arranged in groups of seven in leaf axils on a peduncle 5–15 mm (0.20–0.59 in) long, the individual buds on a pedicel up to 4 mm (0.16 in) long. Mature buds are glaucous, cylindrical to oval, 8–14 mm (0.31–0.55 in) long and 4–8 mm (0.16–0.31 in) wide with a striated, conical to rounded operculum. Flowering occurs spasmodically and the flowers are white. The fruit is a woody, cup-shaped to barrel-shaped or conical capsule 6–10 mm (0.24–0.39 in) long and 7–11 mm (0.28–0.43 in) wide, often glaucous at first, and with the valves at the level of the rim.

== Taxonomy and naming ==
Eucalyptus cretata was first formally described in 1990 by Peter Lang and Ian Brooker from a specimen collected by Lang near Darke Peak in 1989. The description was published in the Journal of the Adelaide Botanic Gardens. The specific epithet (cretata) is a Latin word meaning "marked with chalk", referring to the chalky bloom on the branchlets and flower buds.

== Distribution and habitat ==
Darke Peak mallee grow in mallee communities on the central Eyre Peninsula, between Caralue Bluff Conservation Park, Lock and Cowell.
