= Rudall (disambiguation) =

Rudall, South Australia is a town and locality in Australia.

Rudall may also refer to:

== People ==
- Eleanor Rudall (1881–1960), English composer, pianist and teacher
- Nicholas Rudall (1940–2018), Professor of Classical Languages and Literatures, University of Chicago
- Paula Rudall (born 1954), British botanist
- Reginald Rudall (1885–1955), Australian lawyer and politician
- Samuel Bruce Rudall (1859–1945), South Australian politician
- Rudall Hayward (1900–1974), New Zealand filmmaker

== Places ==
- Rudall Conservation Park, a protected area in Australia
- Rudall River, river in Western Australia
