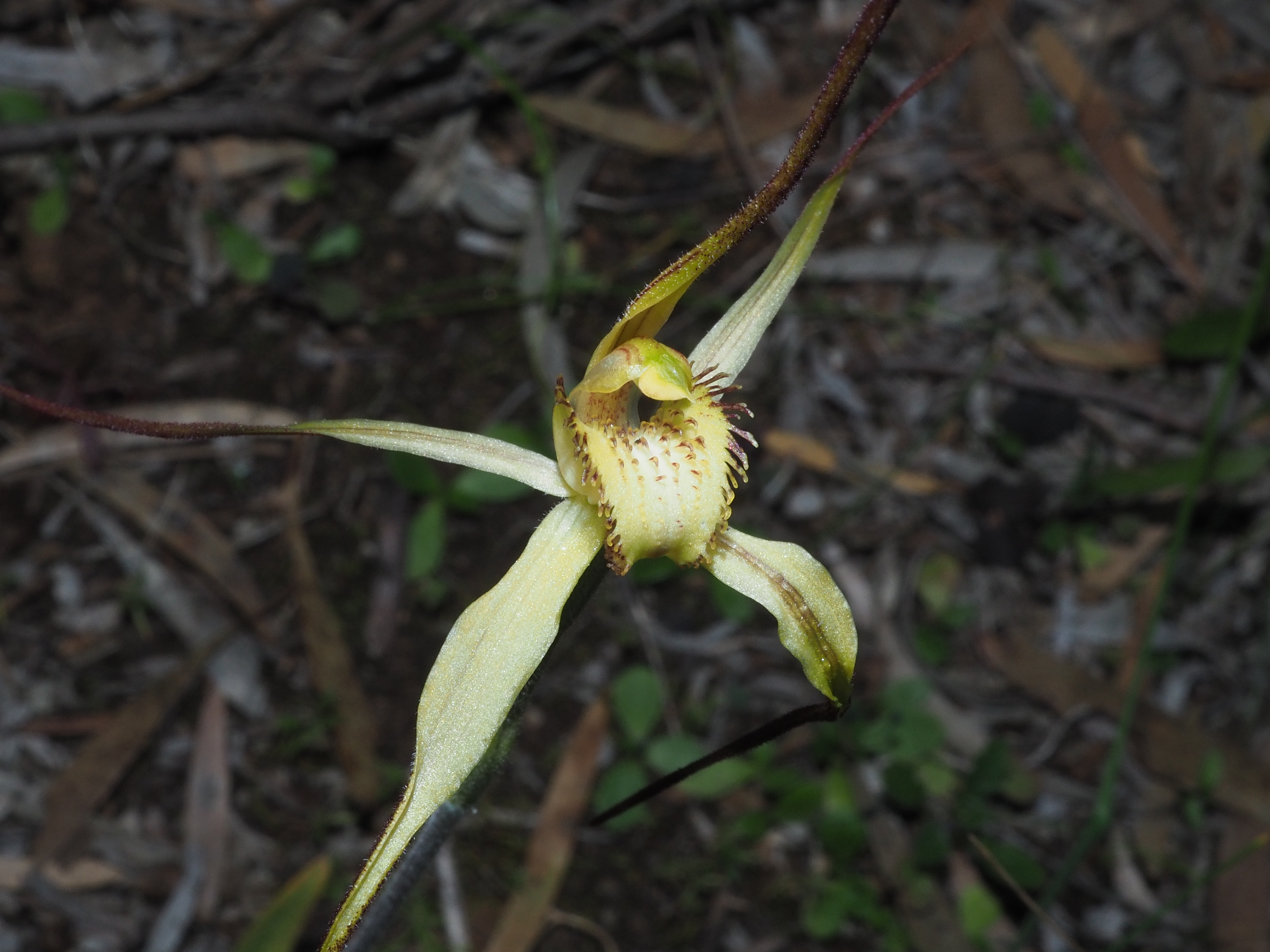
- In Carappee Hill Conservation Park

Scientific classification
- Kingdom: Plantae
- Clade: Tracheophytes
- Clade: Angiosperms
- Clade: Monocots
- Order: Asparagales
- Family: Orchidaceae
- Subfamily: Orchidoideae
- Tribe: Diurideae
- Genus: Caladenia
- Species: C. zephyra

Binomial name
- Caladenia zephyra (D.L.Jones) R.J.Bates

Synonyms
- Arachnorchis zephyra D.L.Jones

= Caladenia zephyra =

Species of orchid

Caladenia zephyra is a plant in the orchid family Orchidaceae and is endemic to South Australia. It is a ground orchid with a single, densely hairy leaf and a single cream-coloured to very pale yellow flower with blackish glandular hairs on the sepals and petals. It occurs on the Eyre Peninsula but may have a wider distribution.

== Description ==
Caladenia zephyra is a terrestrial, perennial, deciduous herb with a single densely hairy, narrow oblong to lance-shaped leaf 60–120 mm (2–5 in) long and 5–7 mm (0.2–0.3 in) wide. The leaf is dull green with a purple blotched base. A single cream-coloured to very pale yellow flower is borne on a densely hairy, wiry flowering stem 150–250 mm (6–10 in) tall. The dorsal sepal is erect, 45–60 mm (2–2 in) long and 2–3.5 mm (0.08–0.1 in) wide but suddenly tapers at about one-third of its length to a thread-like tail with blackish glandular hairs. The lateral sepals are 55–70 mm (2–3 in) long and 3–4.5 mm (0.1–0.2 in) wide but suddenly taper like the dorsal sepal to a glandular tip. The petals are 37–55 mm (1–2 in) long and 2–3 mm (0.08–0.1 in) wide and also taper to a thread-like, glandular tip. The labellum is egg-shaped to lance-shaped, 13–17 mm (0.5–0.7 in) long and 8–10 mm (0.3–0.4 in) wide and erect near its base before curving downwards. The side lobes of the labellum are erect, about 3 mm (0.1 in) wide with between seven and twelve thread like teeth about 2 mm (0.08 in) long on each side, each with a small egg-shaped tip. There are six rows of club-shaped, creamy yellow calli along the mid-line of the labellum. Flowering occurs in late August and September.

== Taxonomy and naming ==
This species was first formally described in 2006 by David Jones who gave it the name Arachnorchis zephyra. The type specimen was collected in the Carappee Hill Conservation Park and the description was published in Australian Orchid Research. In 2008 Robert Bates changed the name to Caladenia zephyra and published the change in Journal of the Adelaide Botanic Garden. The specific epithet (zephyra) means "the west wind", referring to the westerly distribution of the species compared to that of the related and similar C. arenaria.

== Distribution and habitat ==
Caladenia zephyra is only known from the Eyre Peninsula botanical region of South Australia where it grows in mixed Callitris - Allocasuarina woodland, but it may have a more extensive range.
