= Railway stations on the Eyre Peninsula =

Railway stations in South Australia

This article describes the railway stations on the Eyre Peninsula of South Australia that were located on the lines of the Port Lincoln Division of the former South Australian Railways (SAR). Few of them were staffed. All stations were closed in 1968 when the SAR withdrew all passenger services. (Note: Of the other railway lines on Eyre Peninsula, one of them never had passenger services: BHP's Coffin Bay Tramway (a modern heavy-haul line that carried mineral sands from 1966 to 1976). The Middleback Range tramway (which has carried iron ore from BHP mines to the port of Whyalla since 1901, and was upgraded to heavy-haul standard in 1930), took passengers and general freight in its earliest decades. The passenger stations at both ends of the Whyalla and Port Augusta line operated in the early 1970s and late 1980s.)

== History ==
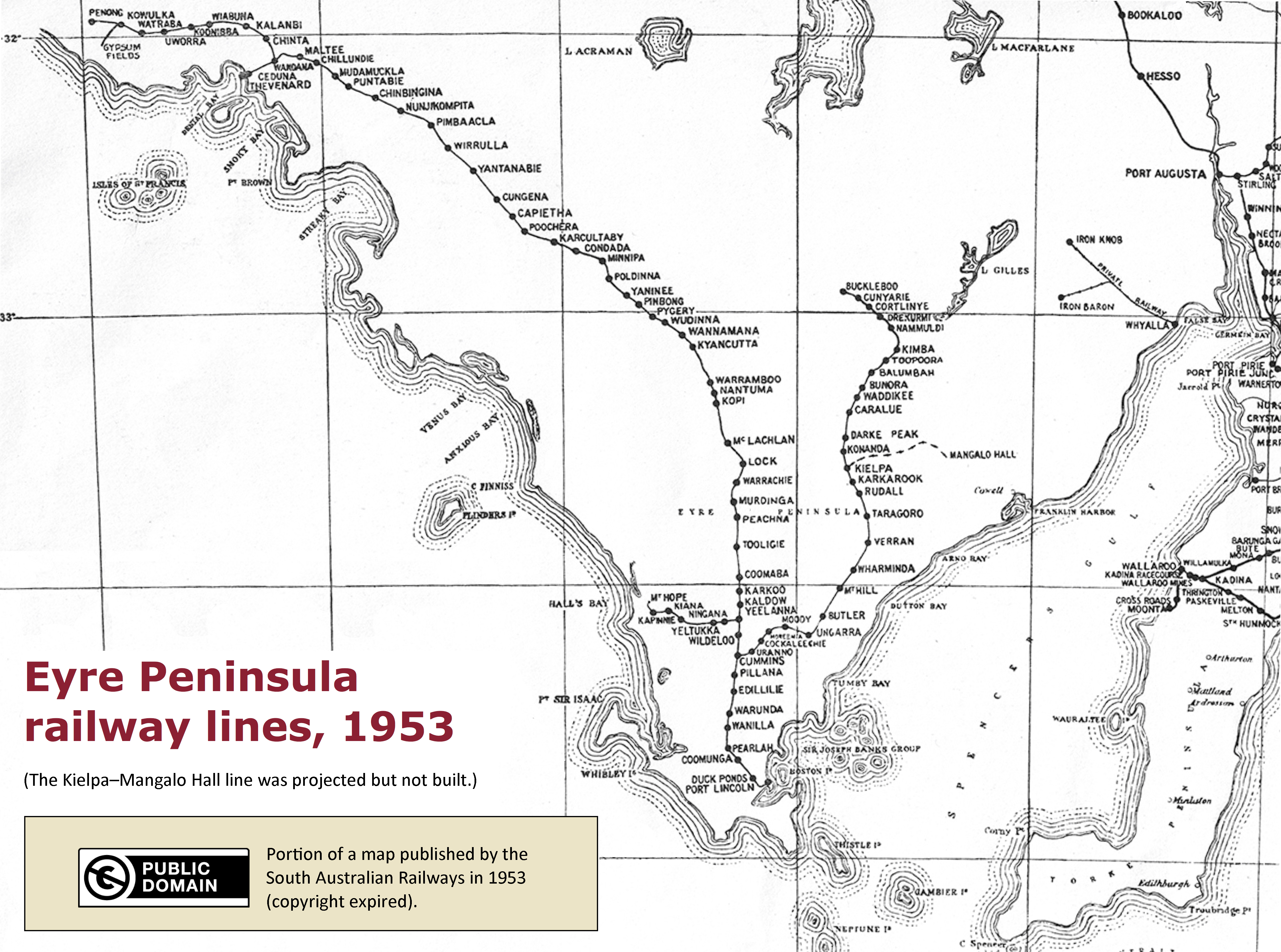
SAR Port Lincoln Division lines at their maximum extent, and their stations, in 1953 (click to enlarge)

From 1908 until the early 1960s, the lines of the SAR's Port Lincoln Division, 832 km (517 mi) long at their maximum extent, were the lifeline for much of Eyre Peninsula because roads were non-existent at the dawn of the century and substandard even at the end of that period. The lines did not follow the spread of agricultural settlement; in most cases the railways preceded settlement and in fact made it possible. As the railways were built, towns were surveyed along the way. Some of these grew into small settlements and a few prospered. Only three towns along the railway (Port Lincoln, Ceduna and Penong) existed before the coming of the railway; all the others were established because of it. Trains were not just a service to the communities along the line; they were an essential, inseparable part of those communities. Regularly scheduled trains conveyed passengers, but often in very small numbers. More important was the service that these trains provided in the way of mails and parcels, bringing inwards supplies to the townships along the lines and taking fresh eggs, cream and other commodities back to Port Lincoln. No less important were the goods trains, bringing superphosphate, farm equipment and general goods in, and taking grain and other produce out to the seaboard.

Stations existing in 1953, when the Port Lincoln Division was at its most extensive, are shown in the map.

Only 13 stations on Eyre Peninsula had stationmasters at any time in their history; a small number had caretakers for short periods. After passenger services were withdrawn on 30 August 1968, staff were gradually withdrawn from outlying stations.

== List of stations ==
There were 107 stations in the Port Lincoln Division; 13 of them (shown in bold) had a stationmaster at some stage.

Balumbah

Beautiful Valley

Buckleboo

Bunora

Butler

Capietha

Caralue

Ceduna

Chandada

Charra

Chillundie

Chinbingina

Chinta

Cockaleechie

Coffin Bay

Condada

Coomaba

Coomunga

Cortiinye

Corunna

Cummins

Cungena

Cunyarie

Darke's Peak

Decres Bay

Drekurmi

Duck Ponds

Edillilie

Fowlers Bay

Grantham

Kalanbi

Kaldow

Kapinnie

KarcuItaby

Karkarook

Karkoo

Kevin

Kiana

Kielpa

Kilto

Kimba

Kirton Point

Konanda

Koonibba

Kopi

Kowulka

Kyancutta

Lake MacDonnell

Lock

Maltee

Minnipa

McLachlan

Moody

Moreenia

Mortlock

Moule

Mount Hill

Mount Hope

Mudamuckla

Murat Bay

Murdinga

Nammuldi

Nantuma

Ningana

Nunjikompita

Peachna

Pearlah

Penong

Pillana

Pimbaacla

Pinbong

Pinkawillinie

Poldinna

Poochera

Port LeHunte

Port Lincoln

Proper Bay

Puntabie

Pygery

Ravendale

Rudall

Taragoro

Terre

Thevenard

Tooligie

Toopoora

Ungarra

Uranno

Uworra

Verran

Waddikee

Wandana

Wanilla

Wannamana

Warrachie

Warramboo

Warunda

Watraba

Wharminda

Wiabuna

Wildeloo

Wirrulla

Wudinna

Yaninee

Yantanabie

Yeelanna

Yeltukka

== Station infrastructure ==
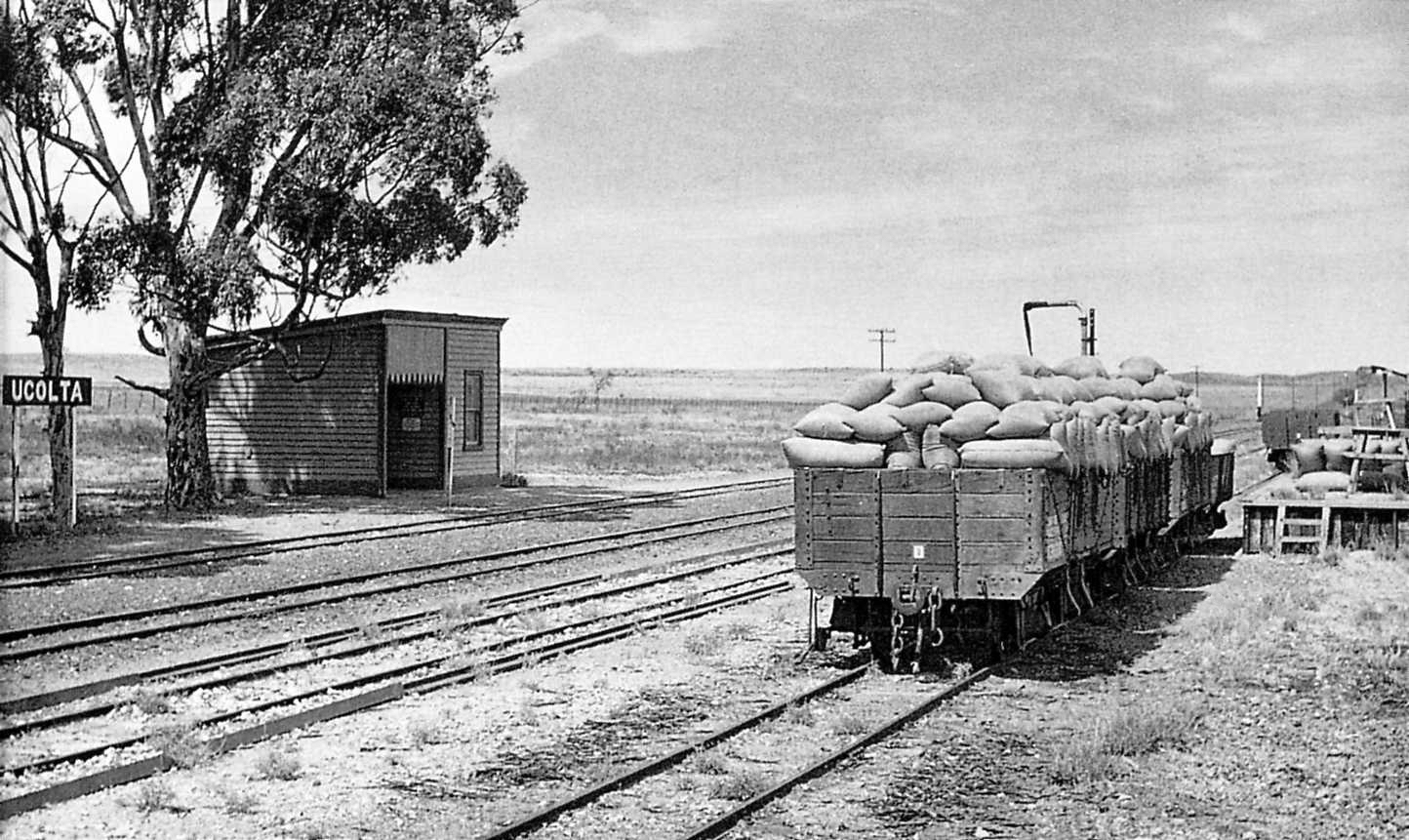
A small unstaffed rural station on an SAR narrow-gauge line like the vast majority of those on Eyre Peninsula, in the early 1950s before bulk grain handling was introduced. This station building was more substantial than the customary simple corrugated iron shelter shed.

At the time the first railway lines were being constructed, from 1907, it was impossible to predict which vicinity would grow and which would not. As a result of lines arriving first and townships being surveyed around them, throughout the peninsula there is a distinct uniformity to the arrangement of railway lines relative to the townships which adjoin them; in most cases the design far exceeded what would be needed.

Routes remained substantially unchanged after 1926. However, many additional sidings were subsequently opened and station yards expanded; and in later years many sidings closed and significant infrastructure and industry changes directly affected the railway. Government policy was to provide sidings at about 8 km (5 mi) intervals along all railways in wheat-growing areas. Surveys for new lines made provision for such sidings, with land reserved at appropriate locations, but some were not built and remained simply as aberrations in the boundaries of railway land. Subsequent extensions were often at about 10 km (6 mi) intervals until mass siding closures occurred from the mid-1980s, when about 24 km (15 mi) became the norm.

The most common arrangement for sidings was a single passing siding. Facilities generally consisted of little more than a corrugated iron shelter, a nameboard and (not always) an earth-built goods loading ramp. Occasionally a hand-operated crane could be found. Larger stations rated a timber station building, and a few had a corrugated iron goods shed. Watering facilities bore little relationship to the importance of the siding; rather, they reflected the necessity for water at regular intervals along the line. Multiple water tanks and huge catchment roofs were often the major fixed infrastructure at otherwise minor localities.

Shelters were for passengers and "take-out" items that ranged from parcels to large consignments (less-than-car load). After general freight services ceased and unit train working was introduced, in the early 1980s, a major program of siding extensions took place, during which the shelters were removed, leaving only a sign on a post visible to locomotive crews.

No station has been open on Eyre Peninsula since passenger services ceased on 30 August 1968. Buildings on wheat-traffic lines outside of Port Lincoln that had been used by Genesee & Wyoming Australia (GWA), such as employee sleeping barracks, were vacated when the company ceased operating bulk-wheat unit trains in May 2019.

No stations exist on the only operating remnant of the narrow-gauge system on the peninsula – the 67 km (42 mi) line from the gypsum mine at the uninhabited locality of Kevin, (Note: Kevin: 32°01′30″S 133°05′15″E) by Lake MacDonnell, to the port of Thevenard (Note: Thevenard: 32°08′59″S 133°38′53″E) However, the timber building that served as the SAR's Thevenard station before 1968 remains in use by Aurizon, which has operated the line since 2022, as an office. (Note: Old SAR station building at Thevenard: 32°08′50″S 133°39′12″E)

== Commodity loading facilities ==
=== Gypsum ===
At the minesite at Kevin, gypsum is mined using bulldozers and excavation equipment. It is retained for several years, in stockpiles about 500 metres (550 yards) long, to allow rainfall to leach out salt. Front-end loaders then dump the gypsum into bulk hopper cars from the side. Unloading is at a large shipping terminal at Cape Thevenard, adjoining the town of Ceduna. (Note: Shipping terminal at Cape Thevenard: 32°08′59″S 133°38′53″E)

=== Wheat ===
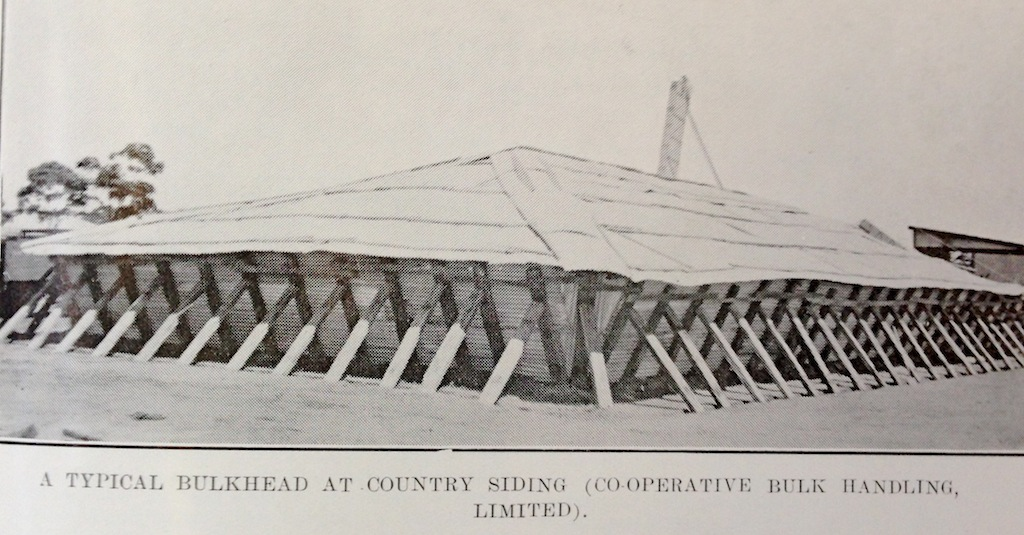

The braced corrugated steel sides and roof of this grain storage in the 1930s, which prevent spoilage by pests, are common to present-day overflow grain storage. Click to enlarge.

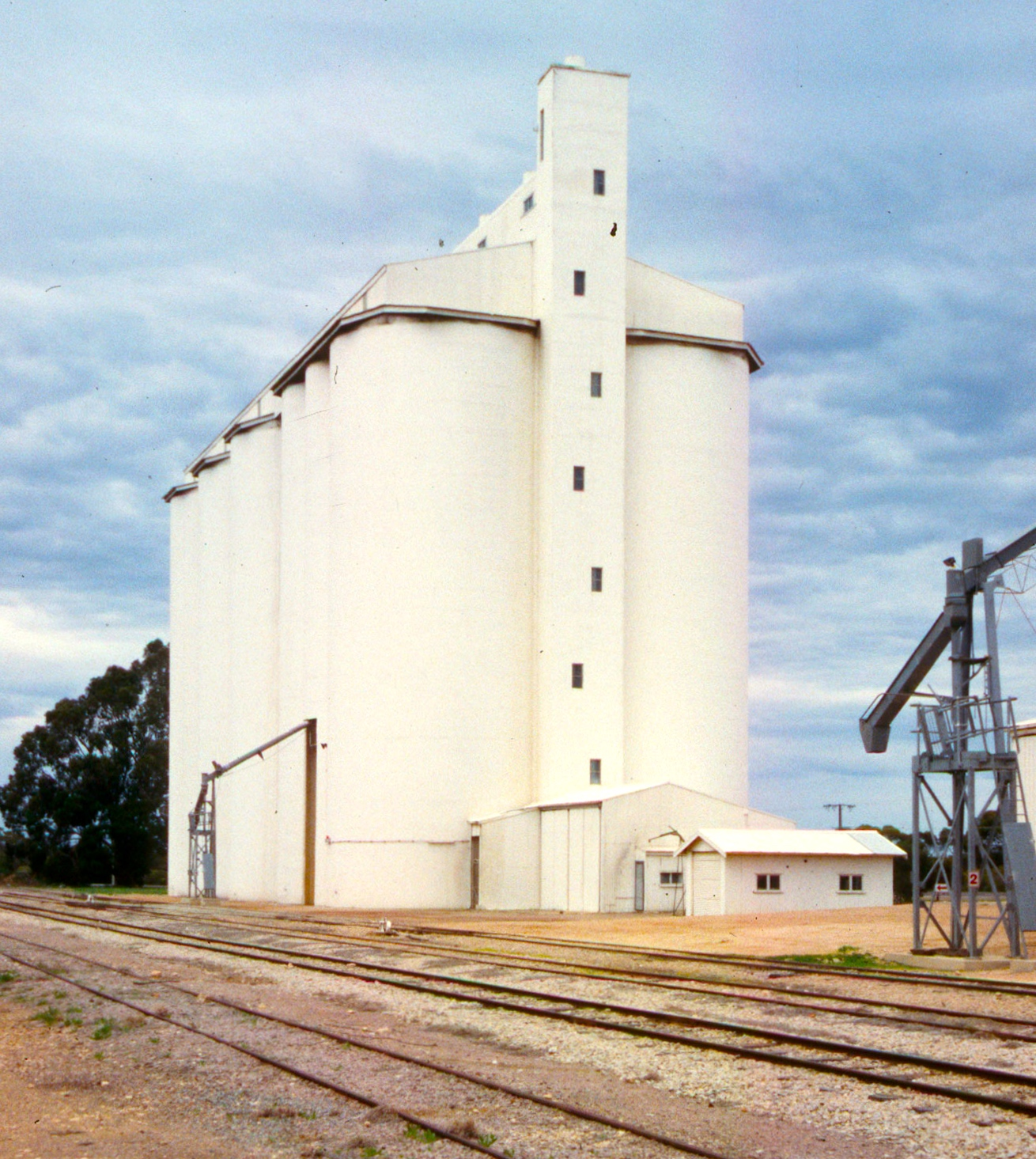

This silo, one of two types at Minnipa, is typical of those built at the start of the bulk handling era in the 1950s.

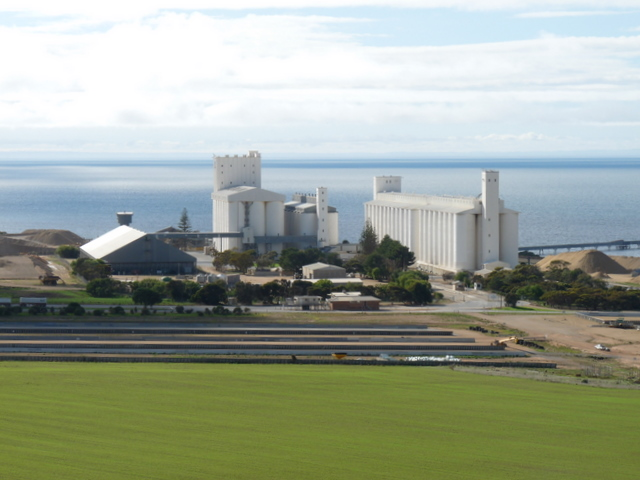

The bulk handling complex at Ardrossan, on Yorke Peninsula, has several types of silo and shed storage; in the foreground are rows of overflow storage under tarpaulins.

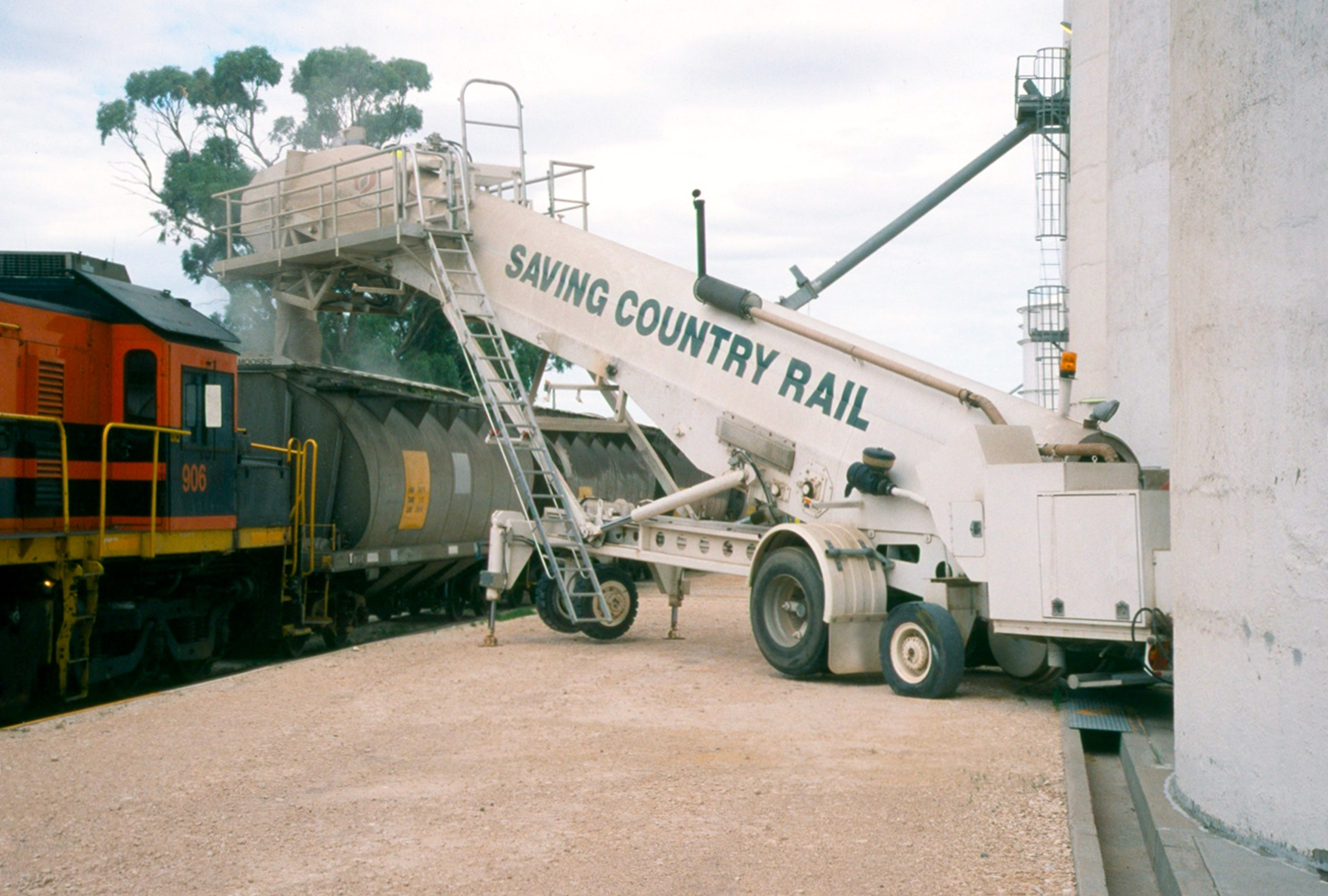

The AusRail loader's introduction boosted the loading of wheat to 2000 tonnes per hour.

The railway network on Eyre Peninsula before 1930 was built with a single purpose in mind: the movement of grain to the coast. All but one of the public sidings that were open before 1950 was used for bagged grain shipment.

In early days, moving grain from farm to the end-use customer had been time-consuming and expensive. Grain was collected into jute bags straight from the header and loaded on to a horse and cart, or train, for storage until it was possible to transport it to a port to be exported. The floor comprised pine or mallee logs known as dunnage. Large amounts of grain were lost through spillage and a lack of effective hygiene and pest control measures. Later, curtained grain stacks with low sheet steel "mouse-proof" walls, corrugated iron roofing and hessian curtains for protection from the rain largely solved the mouse problem but each and every bag had to be lifted at each stage by manual labour. Bulk handling of grain was introduced to South Australia later than in other states: in 1955, a year after it had lobbied the South Australian Government and presented a draft Bill, the South Australian Wheat and Woolgrowers' Association purchased its first silo; the first silo on Eyre Peninsula was opened in 1958.

Despite the huge improvement brought about by bulk handling, conventional outloading equipment at the country silos on Eyre Peninsula only filled rail wagons at up to about 200 tonnes per hour. In 2003, a mobile fast loader was developed to fill rail wagons at 1000 tonnes per hour, allowing a full-length train to be loaded at one location in a couple of hours.

The table shows the 17 grain silos on Eyre Peninsula serviced by rail at the time rail haulage ceased in May 2019. Their owner, Viterra, a trading entity of Glencore, announced two months later that three of them – at Waddikee, Kielpa, and Wharminda – would not be operating in 2019–2020.

Eyre Peninsula silos served by rail before 2019
Wudinna to Cummins	Kimba to Cummins	Cummins to Port Lincoln
Wudinna; 33°02′56″S 135°27′40″E	Kimba; 33°08′22″S 136°25′21″E	Cummins; 34°16′06″S 135°43′31″E
Kyancutta; 33°08′05″S 135°33′19″E	Waddikee; 33°18′54″S 136°15′18″E	Edillilie; 34°24′50″S 135°42′27″E
Warramboo; 33°14′41″S 135°35′54″E	Darke Peak; 33°28′14″S 136°11′54″E	Port Lincoln (shipping terminal silos); 34°43′22″S 135°52′13″E
Lock; 33°34′02″S 135°45′29″E	Kielpa; 33°35′13″S 136°13′24″E
Murdinga; 33°43′25″S 135°42′30″E	Rudall; 33°41′23″S 136°16′20″E
Tooligie; 33°51′35″S 135°42′13″E	Wharminda; 33°57′14″S 136°14′44″E
Yeelanna; 34°08′29″S 135°43′45″E	Ungarra; 33°10′44″S 136°02′50″E

== See also ==
- Rail transport in South Australia
