= Yeldulknie Conservation Park =

Protected area in South Australia

- IUCN category Ia (strict nature reserve)
- Location within South Australia
- Location: South Australia
- Nearest city: Cleve
- Coordinates: 33°38′36″S 136°34′06″E
- Area: 32.83 km^{2} (12.68 sq mi)
- Established: 21 September 1989
- Governing body: Department for Environment and Water

Yeldulknie Conservation Park is a protected area in the Australian state of South Australia located on the Eyre Peninsula in the gazetted locality of Cleve about 10 kilometres (6.2 mi) north-east of the town centre in Cleve.

The conservation park was proclaimed on 21 September 1989 under the state's National Parks and Wildlife Act 1972 in respect to land in sections 327, 328 and 329 in the cadastral unit of the Hundred of Mann. It was constituted to permit access under the state's Mining Act 1971. Its name was derived from the Yeldulkinie Reservoir. As of July 2016, the conservation park covered an area of 32.83 square kilometres (12.68 sq mi).

The conservation park is described as consisting of “mallee woodlands”. It is known as a site for the plant species Acacia praemorsa (senna wattle) which is listed as “Vulnerable” on the list of threatened species prepared under section 178 of the Australian Environment Protection and Biodiversity Conservation Act 1999.

The conservation park is classified as an IUCN Category IA protected area.

== See also ==
- Protected areas of South Australia
