= Verran (disambiguation) =

Verran may refer to:

== Places ==
- Verran Municipality, a former municipality in the old Nord-Trøndelag county, Norway
- Verran, South Australia, a locality in the District Council of Cleve

== People ==
- Harry Verran (1930–2015), a Canadian politician
- Helen Verran, an Australian historian of science and academic
- John Stanley Verran (1883–1952), an Australian politician
- John Verran (1856–1932), an Australian politician and trade unionist
- Verran Tucker (born 1988), an American footballer

== Other ==
- Verran Sparebank, a defunct Norwegian savings bank
