= Darke Range Conservation Park =

Protected area in South Australia

- IUCN category VI (protected area with sustainable use of natural resources)
- Location within South Australia
- Location: South Australia
- Nearest city: Darke Peak.
- Coordinates: 33.4755°S 136.1758°E
- Area: 6.93 km^{2} (2.68 sq mi)
- Established: 28 November 1985
- Governing body: Department for Environment and Water

Darke Range Conservation Park is a protected area in the Australian state of South Australia located on the Eyre Peninsula in the gazetted locality of Darke Peak about 2 kilometres (1.2 mi) west of the town centre in Darke Peak.

The conservation park was proclaimed on 28 November 1985 under the state's National Parks and Wildlife Act 1972 in respect to land in following sections and cadastral units - section 116 in the Hundred of Pascoe and section 58 in the Hundred of Darke both of which are located to the immediate west of the Darke Peak town centre.

Additional land in the Hundred of Darke was added to the conservation park on 23 September 2010 to the immediate north of its original extent for the following official reason:

The addition to Darke Range Conservation Park will help protect the threatened ecosystems and species unique to this locality, as well as the nationally threatened peppermint gum woodland...

Its name was derived from the Darke Range on which it is located. As of June 2016, the conservation park covered an area of 6.93 square kilometres (2.68 sq mi).

The conservation park is classified as an IUCN Category VI protected area.

== See also ==
- Protected areas of South Australia
