= Koonibba (disambiguation) =

Koonibba is a locality and an Aboriginal community and former mission in South Australia.

Koonibba may also refer to the following places and organisations in South Australia:

- Koonibba Football Club
- Koonibba Aboriginal School - refer List of Aboriginal schools in South Australia
- Koonibba Railway Station - a stop on the Eyre Peninsula Railway
- Koonibba Test Range, a rocket test range and space research site
