= Verran Tanks Conservation Park =

Protected area in South Australia

- IUCN category III (natural monument or feature)
- Location within South Australia
- Location: South Australia, Verran
- Nearest city: Rudall
- Coordinates: 33°50′07″S 136°13′52″E
- Area: 1.19 km^{2} (0.46 sq mi)
- Established: 28 July 1983
- Visitors: No visitor access (in 2007)
- Governing body: Department for Environment and Water

Verran Tanks Conservation Park is a protected area in the Australian state of South Australia, located on the Eyre Peninsula in the gazetted locality of Verran about 105 kilometres (65 mi) north of Port Lincoln and about 55 kilometres (34 mi) south-east of Lock.

It was proclaimed on 28 July 1983 under the National Parks and Wildlife Act 1972 to “conserve remnant vegetation” on land all in Section 71 of the cadastral unit of the Hundred of Verran and which was previously gazetted as a water reserve. The proclamation excluded “access under state mining legislation”. Its name is derived from a water storage facility known as the “Verran Tank”.

As of 2007, the Verran Tanks Conservation Park was reported as being “dominated by mallee and shrubland” and included the following plant associations and species of conservation concern. A “mallee community” dominated by Eucalyptus peninsularis considered to be “a state endangered ecosystem” was present in the conservation park. Four species which were described as being “state rare species” have also been recorded in the conservation park: six-nerve spine-bush (Acacia hexaneura), Levenhookia stipitata, the rasp daisy-bush (Olearia picridifolia) and the tawny leek-orchid (Prasophyllum constrictum).

As of 2007, there was no access for visitors into the interior of the conservation park, nor were there plans to create such access.

The conservation park is classified as an IUCN Category III protected area.

== See also ==
- Protected areas of South Australia
