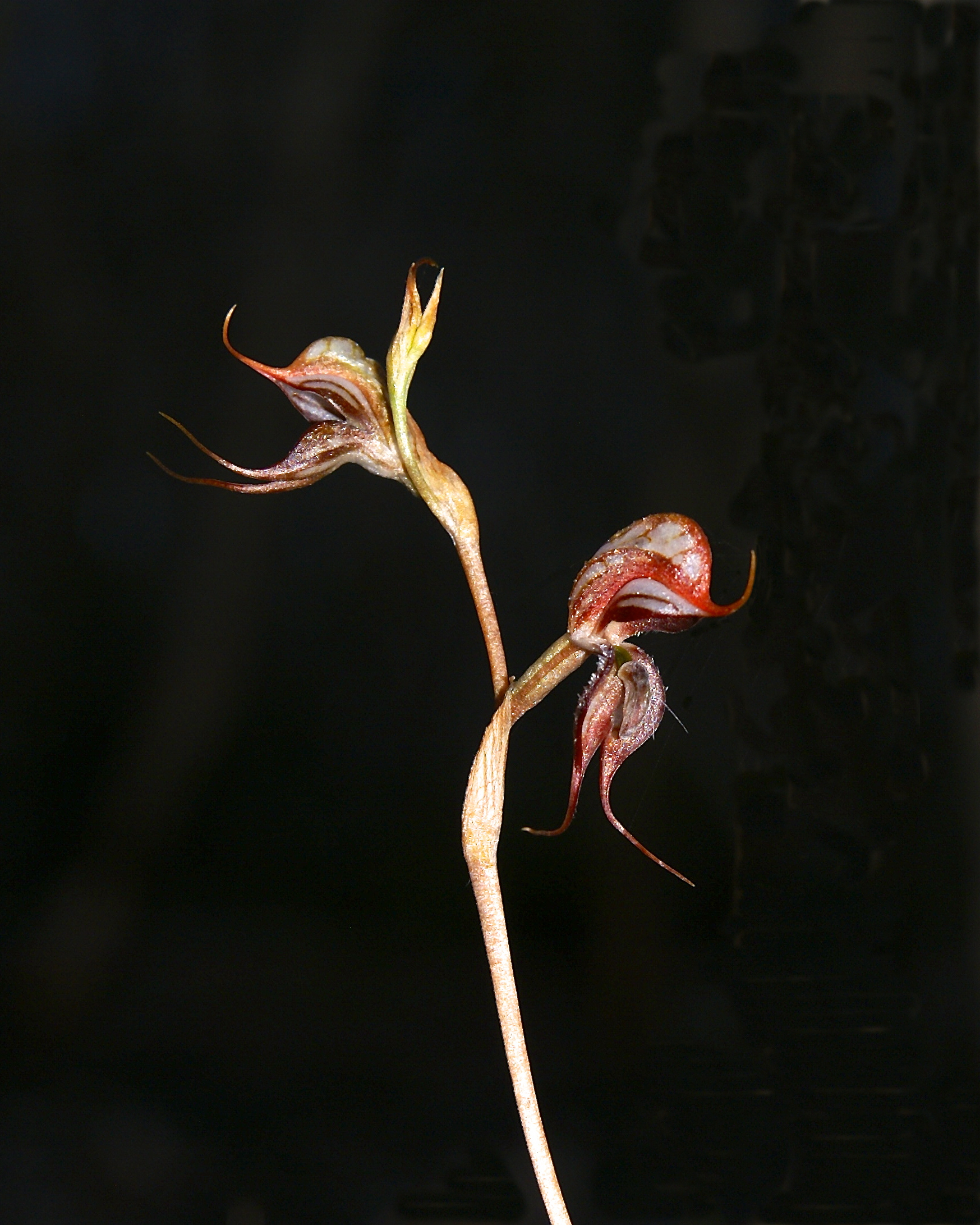
- Pterostylis mirabilis growing near Cleve

Conservation status
- Vulnerable (EPBC Act)

Scientific classification
- Kingdom: Plantae
- Clade: Tracheophytes
- Clade: Angiosperms
- Clade: Monocots
- Order: Asparagales
- Family: Orchidaceae
- Subfamily: Orchidoideae
- Tribe: Cranichideae
- Genus: Pterostylis
- Species: P. mirabilis

Binomial name
- Pterostylis mirabilis R.Br.

Synonyms
- Oligochaetochilus mirabilis (R.Br.) Szlach.

= Pterostylis mirabilis =

Nodding rufous-hood

Species of orchid

Pterostylis mirabilis, commonly known as the nodding rufous-hood, is a plant in the orchid family Orchidaceae and is endemic to South Australia. It has a rosette of leaves at its base and up to ten greenish-white flowers with a narrow hood, down-turned lateral sepals and a thin-textured, insect-like labellum.

== Description ==
Pterostylis mirabilis, is a terrestrial, perennial, deciduous, herb with an underground tuber. It has a rosette of between five and twelve egg-shaped, overlapping leaves which are about 20 mm (0.8 in) long and 4–8 mm (0.2–0.3 in) wide. Flowering plants have a rosette at the base of the flowering spike but the leaves are usually withered by flowering time. Up to ten greenish-white flowers which lean forward on a separate stalk are borne on a flowering stem up to 80 mm (3 in) tall. The dorsal sepal and petals form a hood or "galea" over the column with the dorsal sepal having a narrow tip 15 mm (0.6 in) long. The lateral sepals are narrow and turn downwards and suddenly narrow to thread-like tips up to 25 mm (1 in) long. The labellum is thinly-textured, green to pale brown and insect-like, about 8 mm (0.3 in) long with two hairs about 2 mm (0.08 in) long on the "head" end and eight to eleven shorter ones on each side of the "body".

== Taxonomy and naming ==
This orchid was first formally described in 2007 by David Jones and given the name Oligochaetochilus mirabilis from a specimen collected near the road from Cowell to Kimba. The description was published in The Orchadian. In 2008, Robert Bates changed the name to Pterostylis mirabilis. The specific epithet (mirabilis) is a Latin word meaning "wonderful" or "strange".

== Distribution and habitat ==
The nodding rufous-hood grows in rocky, hilly places, often under Melaleuca uncinata scrub. It is only known from about twelve locations on the Eyre Peninsula.

== Conservation ==
Pterostylis mirabilis is listed as "vulnerable" under the Australian Government Environment Protection and Biodiversity Conservation Act 1999. The main threats to the species are habitat fragmentation, weed invasion, inappropriate fire regimes and agricultural practices.
