= John Charles Darke =

Australian explorer (1806–1844)

- Born: 1806; Hereford, England
- Died: October 22, 1844 (aged 37–38); Gawler Ranges, South Australia
- Cause of death: Blood loss from stab wounds
- Known for: Exploring Van Diemen's Land

John Charles Darke (1806–22 October 1844) was a surveyor and explorer in Van Diemen's Land (now Tasmania) and South Australia. He died after being speared by Aboriginals in 1844.

== Early years ==
Darke was born in Hereford, England, in 1806, the son of William Darke, a prosperous owner of property in Hereford, and Elizabeth Darke. Practically nothing is known of his early years in England.

He arrived in Van Diemen's Land in 1824, accompanied by two of his uncles: Edward Davey Wedge and John Helder Wedge who became the Second Assistant Surveyor in the Land Survey Department.

During 1824–25, Darke spent time with his Uncle John learning the profession of surveying as they moved around the state. In January 1826, Darke joined Lieutenant Williams of the 40th Regiment in pursuit and capture of the bushranger, Thomas Jeffries, and in consequence was granted 500 acres of land. In early March he again joined Lieutenant Williams, this time in search of Matthew Brady and his gang. Brady was wounded in the leg, but escaped. He was captured later in the month by John Batman and his party.

== Surveyor-explorer ==
In 1832 the Land Survey Department, under Surveyor-General George Frankland, began preparing for a trigonometric survey of the island, and Darke was successful in obtaining a temporary position within the department. One area of particular interest to Frankland was the area west of Wylds Craig (then known as the Peak of Teneriffe). An escaped convict from Sarah Island, James Goodwin, has passed through the area on his way back to the settled districts.

With five men, Darke was sent to explore the region west of Wylds Craig beginning on 19 March 1833. One of the men was James Goodwin: "an excellent hand in the bush who had formerly escaped from Macquarie Harbour". The expedition came to an end on 8 April due to hunger and fatigue, without achieving its survey aims. Darke began a second expedition to Wylds Craig in May 1833 which also ended without success when Darke suffered severe burns to his right foot. He was unable to obtain permanent employment as a surveyor and left Van Diemen's Land for the Port Phillip District in February 1836 where he took up land near Geelong.

Darke was recruited as a surveyor in South Australia 1838. He wrote a letter of resignation in November 1839 (probably due to his romantic attachment to a Miss Elizabeth Carter), and was sacked on 31 December 1839 for being absent from duty. In 1840 Darke married Elizabeth Isabella Carter, sister-in-law to South Australia police inspector Alexander Tolmer.

In 1844 Darke was named as the leader of a privately funded expedition to explore the country west and north-west of Port Lincoln and Spencer Gulf. On 12 April, he and three other men left Adelaide on the Governor Gawler and sailed for Port Lincoln. The party left Port Lincoln on 29 August to begin their exploration.

Led by Darke, the party comprised Darke's friend and second in command, surveyor John Henry Theakston (d.1878), plus two men hired as tent-keepers and cooks. One was named James Howard, the other is unidentified. They travelled though an ocean of scrub to beyond the Gawler Ranges, Darke having found no land suitable for settling. The party began their retreat from this waterless area on 16 October.

== Final diary entry ==
Darke's final diary entry was on 22 October: "Accompanied by the [three] blacks who were joined by nine others, I proceeded to the waterhole, about three miles, but more easterly than our course; and came about 2 o'clock to a large gritstone rock where I found abundance of feed and water on a plain about 200 yards wide by half a mile long, surrounded by thick scrub. The natives accompanied us until just before encamping. I gave them all I could spare for taking us to the water. They seemed very friendly disposed..."

The diary continues in the hand of Darke's second-in-command, John Theakston, and describes how Darke was speared in the stomach and knee by three natives. His death is recorded by Theakston: "I here dressed the wounds of Mr Darke, and bled him, but found his extremities getting cold, and I informed him. I feared the event. At 10 o'clock he told me he was dying, that mortification had taken place, he was out of pain; he gave me his last commands and died at five minutes to twelve, quite calm to the last minute. I carried the body of Mr Darke to the Table Topped Peaks and buried him on a small grassy plain at the foot of them, in a grave five feet deep."

== Position of grave ==
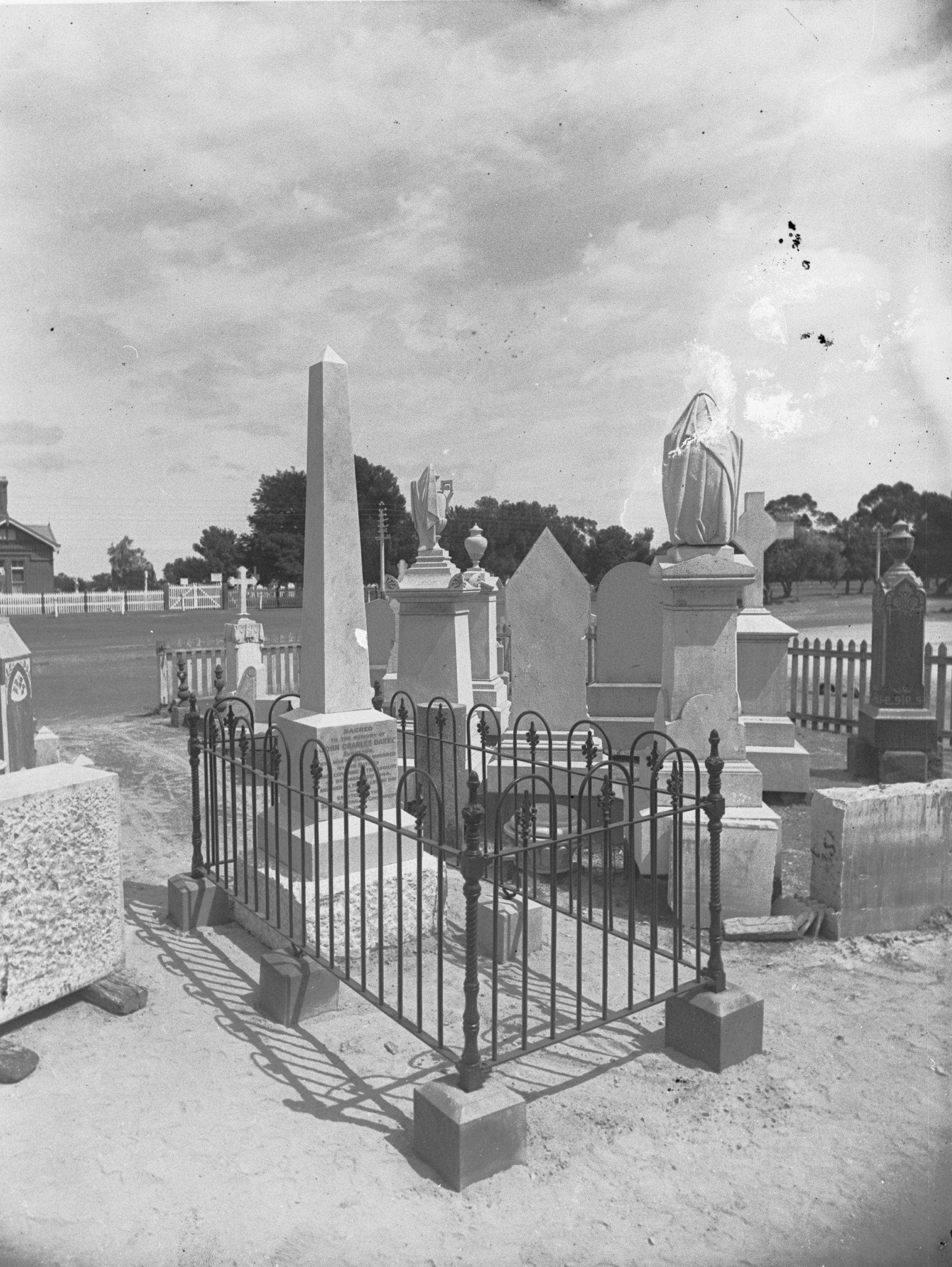
Grave of John Charles Darke, c. 1925

In a letter to The Adelaide Observer in 1891, a Mr A. J. Foulds stated: "In a hollow on the north-west of the most northern peak or hump (which is the highest, and is in fact Darkes Peak) the grave is situated, and there the bold explorer lies, with all the country about to himself, for very rarely indeed does the feet of man – white or black – ever tread in that lonely desert."

In 1909, Surveyor W. G. Evans located Darke's grave and confirmed the finding by partly opening the grave: "found part of a shin bone (decayed), hip bone – good preservation, but crumbled when exposed to air… did not disturb grave more than necessary, mounded up afterwards."

The government of South Australia created a reserve around the grave site in 1910 and erected an obelisk surrounded by an iron fence.

== Legacy ==
Darke's name is perpetuated by Darke Peak, a mountain in the Darke Ranges located in the centre of Eyre Peninsula in the locality of Darke Peak.

Two memorials in addition to the obelisk at the grave site commemorate the life of Darke. On the centenary of Darke's departure from Adelaide on his final expedition, a bronze tablet was fixed to the wall of a building in King William Street, Adelaide, near the spot where the expedition departed. In a similar tribute, a plaque was unveiled on 29 August 1944 in the Civic Hall at Port Lincoln.

John Theakston went on to serve as second in command to the expedition of the ill-fated John Ainsworth Horrocks, where again through the leader's misfortune he was obliged to assume command.

Darke's widow, Elizabeth, remarried at Sydney in 1858 to prominent physician and author Dr Julius Berncastle MD MRCS (1819–1870). The couple and their family later moved to Melbourne, where Dr Berncastle died in 1870 and Elizabeth in 1881.

== See also ==
- Hundred of Darke
