= Waddikee, South Australia =

Waddikee South Australia
- Coordinates: 33.32°S 136.25°E
- Postcode(s): 5640
- Location: 30 km (19 mi) southwest of Kimba; 60 km (37 mi) northwest of Cleve
- LGA(s): District Council of Kimba; District Council of Cleve
- State electorate(s): Giles; Flinders
- Federal division(s): Grey
Localities around Waddikee:
Caralue	Solomon	Kelly
	Waddikee	Mangalo
	Darke Peak	Jamieson

Waddikee is a locality on Eyre Peninsula in South Australia. It is on the Eyre Peninsula Railway southwest of Kimba.

The former railway stations of Waddikee and Caralue are both in the current locality of Waddikee. Caralue siding opened in 1915. Waddikee siding opened in 1921. The current locality of Caralue is north and west of these stations. The stations had government towns surveyed around them in 1926 and 1927.
