= Rudall Conservation Park =

Protected area in South Australia

- IUCN category III (natural monument or feature)
- Location within South Australia
- Location: South Australia
- Nearest city: Cleve
- Coordinates: 33°38′42″S 136°18′58″E
- Area: 3.57 km^{2} (1.38 sq mi)
- Established: 16 August 1973
- Governing body: Department for Environment and Water

Rudall Conservation Park is a protected area in the Australian state of South Australia located on the Eyre Peninsula in the gazetted locality of Rudall about 18 kilometres (11 mi) west of the town centre in Cleve.

The conservation park was proclaimed on 16 August 1973 under the state's National Parks and Wildlife Act 1972 in respect to land in section 49 in the cadastral unit of the Hundred of Rudall. As of June 2016, the conservation park covered an area of 3.57 square kilometres (1.38 sq mi).

In 1980, the conservation park was described as follows:

The eastern end of Rudall Conservation Park preserves a small area of mallee/broombush association with some pure stands of broombush.

The park lies on a gentle foot-slope with sandy soils to the east and loamy soils to the west. The eastern end of the park is dominated by a scrub/heath to open scrub/heath of Eucalyptus incrassata, E. foecunda, Melaleuca uncinata with some pure stands of M. uncinata. The western end is cleared and features an open grassland of predominantly introduced species. A small reservoir is also found in this part of the park

The western end of the park is severely degraded as a result of heavy grazing. The eastern end has suffered some grazing but remains quite dense in places.

The conservation park is classified as an IUCN Category III protected area. In 1980, it was listed on the now-defunct Register of the National Estate.

== See also ==
- Protected areas of South Australia
