= Middlecamp Hills Conservation Park =

Protected area in South Australia

- IUCN category Ia (strict nature reserve)
- Location within South Australia
- Location: South Australia
- Nearest city: Cowell
- Coordinates: 33°38′43″S 136°45′42″E
- Area: 8.35 km^{2} (3.22 sq mi)
- Established: 24 November 1977
- Governing body: Department of Environment, Water and Natural Resources

Middlecamp Hills Conservation Park is a protected area in the Australian state of South Australia located on the Eyre Peninsula in the gazetted locality of Cowell about 15 kilometres (9.3 mi) west of the town centre in Cowell.

The conservation park was proclaimed on 24 September 1977 under the state's National Parks and Wildlife Act 1972 in respect to land in section 342 in the cadastral unit of the Hundred of Hawker. As of July 2016, the conservation park covered an area of 8.35 square kilometres (3.22 sq mi).

The conservation park is classified as an IUCN Category IA protected area.

== See also ==
- Protected areas of South Australia
