= Campoona, South Australia =

Campoona South Australia
- Coordinates: 33.55595°S 136.41258°E
- Population: 47 (SAL 2021)
- Established: 1998
- Postcode(s): 5640
- Time zone: ACST (UTC+9:30)
  - Summer (DST): ACST (UTC+10:30)
- Location: 253 km (157 mi) north-west of Adelaide; 18 km (11 mi) north-west of Cleve
- LGA(s): District Council of Cleve
- Region: Eyre Western
- County: Jervois
- State electorate(s): Flinders
- Federal division(s): Grey
Localities around Campoona:
| Darke Peak | Jamieson | Mangalo |
| Kielpa | Campoona | Mangalo |
| Rudall | Rudall; Cleve | Cleve |
- Footnotes: Locations; Adjoining localities

Campoona is a locality in the Australian state of South Australia located on Eyre Peninsula about 253 kilometres (157 mi) north-west of the state capital of Adelaide and about 18 kilometres (11 mi) north-west of the municipal seat in Cleve. The area is part of the territory of the Parnkalla Aboriginal Australians.

Campoona's name was officially adopted and its boundaries were both created on 23 December 1998. Its boundaries are identical to the boundaries of the cadastral unit of the Hundred of Campoona, with both forming a square with an area of 260 square kilometres (100 sq mi).

The dominant industry is broadacre farming of grains and sheep. Archer Exploration Limited proposes to establish a graphite mine in the area in 2015.

Campoona is located within the federal division of Grey, the state electoral district of Flinders and the local government area of the District Council of Cleve.
