= Caralue, South Australia =

Caralue South Australia
- Coordinates: 33°17′29″S 136°07′36″E
- Population: 43 (SAL 2021)
- Established: 1924
- Postcode(s): 5641
- Location: 300 km (186 mi) NW of Adelaide
- LGA(s): District Council of Kimba
- Region: Eyre Western
- County: Buxton
- State electorate(s): Giles
- Federal division(s): Grey
Localities around Caralue:
	Panitya	Solomon
Cootra	Caralue
Hambidge	Darke Peak	Waddikee
- Footnotes: Locations; Adjoining localities

Caralue is a locality on Eyre Peninsula in South Australia. It is approximately coincident with the Hundred of Caralue except for the southeastern corner and a notch in the north side of the hundred that are in the localities of Waddikee and Panitya respectively.

Caralue Bluff Conservation Park and Poolgarra Conservation Reserve are both in Caralue. The dominant industry of the rest of the land is agriculture growing crops or sheep.

The original government town of Caralue adjacent to the railway line is now in the bounded locality of Waddikee, southeast of the current boundaries of the locality of Caralue.
