= Jervois =

Jervois may refer to:

== Places ==
=== Australia ===
- County of Jervois, a cadastral unit in South Australia
- Jervois, South Australia, a town on the lower reaches of the Murray River
- Jervois Bridge, over the Port River in Port Adelaide, South Australia
- Jervois Basin Ships' Graveyard on the Port River, South Australia

=== Hong Kong ===
- The Jervois, a 35-storey tower in Sheung Wan, Hong Kong
- Jervois Street in Sheung Wan, Hong Kong

=== New Zealand ===
- Fort Jervois on Ripapa Island in New Zealand
- Mount Jervois, Southern Alps

== People ==
=== Surname ===
- General William Jervois (British Army officer) KH (1782 – 1862), Lieutenant Governor of Hong Kong
- Sir William Jervois, GCMG, CB (1821 – 1897), son of the above, British army officer, diplomat and Governor of Straits Settlements, South Australia and New Zealand

=== Given name ===
- Jervois Newnham, Anglican bishop in Canada
