= District Council of Cleve =

- Local government area
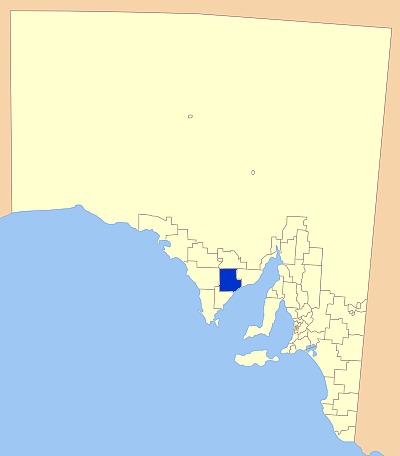
- Location of the District Council of Cleve

- Interactive map of District Council of Cleve
- Coordinates: 33°44′25″S 136°22′24″E
- Country: Australia
- State: South Australia
- Region: Eyre Western
- Established: 1911
- Council seat: Cleve

Government
  - Mayor: Phil Cameron
  - State electorate: Flinders
  - Federal division: Grey

Area
  - Total: 4,506.7 km^{2} (1,740.0 sq mi)

Population
  - Total: 1,742 (LGA 2021)
- Website: District Council of Cleve
LGAs around District Council of Cleve
Wudinna	Kimba	Kimba
Elliston	District Council of Cleve	Franklin Harbour
Tumby Bay	Tumby Bay	Spencer Gulf

The District Council of Cleve is a local government area on the eastern Eyre Peninsula in South Australia. The district is mostly agricultural in nature, but also encompasses the popular coastal tourist town of Arno Bay.

== History ==
The District Council of Cleve is derived from Jervois County, which was incorporated into the District Council of Franklin Harbour when that council was first established in 1880. In 1911, the western end of the county was severed from Franklin Harbour, resulting in the creation of the present council.

The district's major towns were well established when the new council was announced, with Cleve established in 1879 and Arno Bay in 1883 under the name of 'Bligh'. Darke Peak was established in 1914, only three years after the council came into being.

Since before the council's establishment, the economy of the region has been based on agriculture, with cereal crops and livestock production prominent. Aquaculture is an emerging industry in the coastal towns.

== Localities ==
The district encompasses a number of towns and localities, including Arno Bay, Boonerdo, Campoona, Cleve, Darke Peak, Jamieson, Kielpa, Mangalo, Murlong, Rudall, Verran and Wharminda, and part of Hambidge, Hincks and Waddikee.

== Facilities ==
Cleve has the biggest selection of retail shops, including a supermarket, clothing stores, banking facilities, professional & medical services, service industries, post office, rural supplies, hotel, mechanical & RAA services, newsagency and pharmacy. Between them, Arno Bay and Darke Peal provide a general store, a post office, fuel suppliers, mechanical services and a hotel.

The district has an Area school, Pre-school and TAFE campus serving educational needs and a hospital for health needs.

A number of sporting facilities and clubs operate in the area including basketball, lawn bowls, cricket, darts, football, golf, netball, softball, a swimming pool and tennis.

== Council ==
=== 2022 election results ===
2022 South Australian local elections: Cleve
Party	Candidate	Votes	%	±%
Independent	Phil Cameron (elected)	216	24.8	
Independent	Kelly Richardson (elected)	206	23.7	
Independent	Jake Emans (elected)	116	13.3	
Independent	Greg Claughton (elected)	108	12.4	
Independent	Bryan Trigg (elected)	56	6.4	
Independent	Grant Fennell (elected)	52	6.0	
Independent	Robert Quinn (elected)	45	5.2	
Independent	Julie Wetherell	24	2.8	
Independent	Colin Rayson	23	2.6	
Independent National	Grantley Siviour	15	1.7	
Independent	Chris Tarran	10	1.1	
Total formal votes		871	98.8	
Informal votes		11	1.2	
Turnout		882	69.0	+4.6

== Chairmen and mayors ==
- Francis Joseph Brooks (1933–1936)
- Edwin Mathew Mitchell (1936–1947)
- William Henry Pearce (1947–1956)
- Otto Keith Fauser (1956–1959)
- Thomas David Rodda (1959–1960)
- Joseph William Rehn (1961–1964)
- David William Wake (1964)
- George Arthur Potter (1965)
- Thomas David Rodda (1966–1972)
- Royce Alfred Pearce (1972)
- Robert Marshall Burton (1973–1985)
- Dean Horace Turnbull (1985–?)
