= Kielpa, South Australia =

Kielpa South Australia
- Coordinates: 33°35′15″S 136°13′25″E
- Population: 55 (SAL 2021)
- Established: 4 June 1914 (town); 23 December 1998 (locality)
- Postcode(s): 5642
- Time zone: ACST (UTC+9:30)
  - Summer (DST): ACST (UTC+10:30)
- LGA(s): District Council of Cleve
- State electorate(s): Flinders
- Federal division(s): Grey
Localities around Kielpa:
Boonerdo	Darke Peak	Campoona
Boonerdo	Kielpa	Campoona
Murlong	Rudall	Campoona
- Footnotes: Adjoining localities

Kielpa is a town and locality on Eyre Peninsula in South Australia. It is midway between Rudall and Darke Peak on the Eyre Peninsula Railway.

Kielpa once had a school and a post office, however neither remains. The bulk grain silos by the railway line are still in use for barley. Kielpa was proposed as the junction for a branch railway line to Campoona and Mangalo, and the railway was authorised by parliament to be built in 1916, however it was never constructed, and by 1929, the Public Works Committee determined that wheat could be more efficiently transported by motor lorry than by building this line.
