= Mangalo, South Australia =

Mangalo South Australia
- Coordinates: 33.53°S 136.62°E
- Population: 56 (SAL 2021)
- Postcode(s): 5602
- Location: 15 km (9 mi) northeast of Cleve; 40 km (25 mi) northwest of Cowell; 159 km (99 mi) northeast of Port Lincoln
- LGA(s): District Council of Cleve
- State electorate(s): Flinders
- Federal division(s): Grey
Localities around Mangalo:
Waddikee	Kelly	Yalanda
Jamieson, Campoona	Mangalo	Miltalie
Cleve		Cowell

Mangalo is a locality on Eyre Peninsula in South Australia. It has a Memorial Hall, CFS and bulk grain silos but has never had a railway line to service them. The name is believed to be derived from an Aboriginal word for sand.

Kielpa was proposed as the junction for a branch railway line to Campoona and Mangalo, and the railway was authorised by parliament to be built in 1916, however it was never constructed, and by 1929, the Public Works Committee determined that wheat could be more efficiently transported by motor lorry than by building this line. In 1920, one of the reasons not to proceed with building this railway was that it would be redundant to a railway linking Murat Bay to Cowell. However this railway was never built either.

The locality of Mangalo comprises the Hundred of Mangalo and Hundred of Heggaton. It includes the Heggaton Conservation Park.
