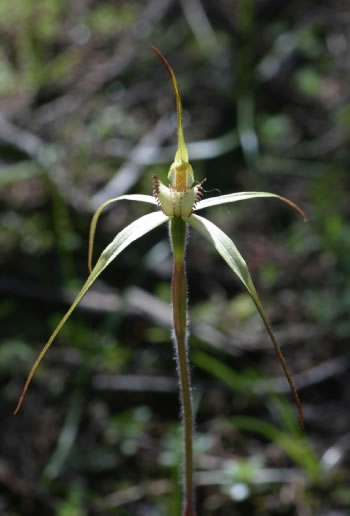

Conservation status
- Endangered (EPBC Act)

Scientific classification
- Kingdom: Plantae
- Clade: Tracheophytes
- Clade: Angiosperms
- Clade: Monocots
- Order: Asparagales
- Family: Orchidaceae
- Subfamily: Orchidoideae
- Tribe: Diurideae
- Genus: Caladenia
- Species: C. arenaria

Binomial name
- Caladenia arenaria Fitzg.

Synonyms
- Arachnorchis arenaria (Fitzg.) D.L.Jones & M.A.Clem.; Caladenia patersonii var. arenaria (Fitzg.) Nicholls; Calonema arenaria Szlach. orth. var.; Calonema arenarium (Fitzg.) Szlach.; Calonemorchis arenaria (Fitzg.) Szlach.

= Caladenia arenaria =

Sand-hill spider orchid

Species of orchid

Caladenia arenaria, commonly known as the sand-hill spider orchid, is a plant in the orchid family Orchidaceae and is endemic to New South Wales. It is a ground orchid with a single, densely hairy leaf and one or two white or pale yellow flowers with maroon tips. Formerly much more widespread, it is now only known from about two thousand individual plants in five locations in the Riverina area and is classed as "Endangered".

== Description ==
Caladenia arenaria is a terrestrial, perennial, deciduous, herb with a single underground tuber which is replaced annually. In late autumn or early winter a linear to narrow lance-shaped leaf is produced which is 15 cm (6 in) long, 6 mm (0.2 in) wide and reddish at the base.

One or (rarely) two pale yellow to creamy-white flowers are borne on a hairy spike up to 40 cm (20 in) high. The dorsal sepal, lateral sepals and petals are up to 80 mm (3 in) long, held horizontally or slightly drooping and tapering to dark reddish, thread-like ends. The labellum is egg-shaped to heart-shaped, about 18 mm (0.7 in) long and 10 mm (0.4 in) wide with teeth up to 3 mm (0.1 in) but decreasing in size towards the front of the labellum. There are four to six rows of calli, shaped like golf stick heads on the centre of the labellum. Flowering occurs from late August to November.

== Taxonomy and naming ==
Caladenia arenaria was first formally described by Robert FitzGerald in 1882 and the description was published in his book, Australian Orchids. The specific epithet (arenaria) is a Latin word meaning "sandy".

== Distribution and habitat ==
Sand-hill spider orchid grows in sclerophyll forest and on sandhills, usually under cypress pine trees. Its range used to extend for 500 km (300 mi) from Deniliquin to Yass and Mudgee but is now only known from five locations between Urana and Narrandera.

== Conservation ==
Caladenia arenaria is listed as "Endangered" under the New South Wales Threatened Species Conservation Act and under the Commonwealth Government Environment Protection and Biodiversity Conservation Act 1999 (EPBC) Act. Five populations with a total of about two thousand individual plants are known. Weeds, grazing and hybridisation with other orchid species are the main threats to the survival of this species.
