= Arno Bay, South Australia =

Arno Bay
- Town
- Coordinates: 33°55′S 136°35′E
- Country: Australia
- State: South Australia
- Region: Eyre Western
- LGA: District Council of Cleve
- Location: 437 km (272 mi) NW of Adelaide
- Established: 1882

Government
  - State electorate: Flinders
  - Federal division: Grey
- Elevation: 1 m (3.3 ft)

Population
  - Total: 219 (UCL 2021)
- Time zone: UTC+9:30 (ACST)
  - Summer (DST): UTC+10:30 (ACST)
- Postcode: 5603
- County: Jervois
Localities around Arno Bay
Cleve	Cleve	Cowell
Verran; Port Neill	Arno Bay	Cowell
Port Neill; Spencer Gulf	Spencer Gulf	Spencer Gulf

Arno Bay is a small fishing and tourist town on the east coast of Eyre Peninsula in South Australia, located on the Lincoln Highway about halfway between Whyalla and Port Lincoln. First proclaimed under the name Bligh in 1883, the current name dates back to 1940. It is a recreational town with a number of marine and nature based attractions, including fishing, surfing and swimming.

== History ==
The area which is now known as Arno Bay was opened up by pastoralists in 1863, with the area being named 'Salt Creek Cove' in these early days. Of the variety of ventures that occurred before the town was built, the sinking of 'The Arno Bay Mine' was possibly the least successful, with water halting all operations. The small town was initially proclaimed in 1882 by G. H. Ayliffe under the name of 'Bligh', after Captain William Bligh, although locals resisted the name change, continually referring to the town as 'Arno Bay' until the official name change.

The town was expected to become a port and a jetty was built in 1880 in anticipation of this. The port was not huge, but nonetheless continued importing fertilisers and exporting cereal crops that were being grown in the district. By 1911, the town had grown substantially, with a school, post office, hotel and new hall established in this period.

The town continued to grow as a port until the point where it was exporting 11,000 tonnes of grain in 1940. In the same year, the decision was finally made to alter the town's official name to 'Arno Bay', named after a sandhill well and not the Italian 'Arno River' as had been suggested. The period of high export came to an abrupt end in 1963 when the storage silos were built, and ocean shipping became redundant to the large trucks that were now the main mechanism of transport.

This signalled the end of Arno Bay as a port, causing the population to drop slowly, eventually leading to its current position as a tourist fishing town.

== Geography ==
Arno bay lies on the eastern Eyre Peninsula, and sits on the Spencer Gulf, a body of water that stretches up to Port Augusta in the north. The town itself lies on the bay of the same name, which is dominated by a mixture of white, sandy beaches, cliffs, and mangrove systems. Of particular note is 'Redbanks', a sedimentary cliff structure which is designated a geological monument by the Geological Society of Australia.

The climate is much like that of Port Lincoln, which is only 118 km to South. The Mediterranean-like climate, with its hot, dry summers and cool, wet winters is typical for most of the Eyre Peninsula.

== Economy ==
The town still retains it position as a minor service centre for the surrounding agricultural communities, but in nowhere near the capacity of the mid-1900s. Cereal crops and sheep are still the major produce of the inland area, as well as minor amounts of other produce.

Fishing has been a minor part of the economy in the past, and recently, aquaculture has come to prominence in the bay, with Yellowtail Kingfish, mulloway and tuna held in large cages. These are farmed on 7 licenses covering 130 hectares in the bay. The aquaculture in the bay is still in development, and further expansions are expected in the future.

Tourism is now one of the largest components of the town's economy, with tourists typically drawn by the areas fishing, water sport and seaside atmosphere. A boat ramp is located in the town, with whiting, snapper, tommy ruff, garfish, salmon and may other popular species caught in the bay, with most of these also available off the town jetty and beach. For boat anglers, the 'Redbanks' region has been known to produce large Mulloway and Snapper, as well as offering scenery in the form of the imposing cliffs. The local aquaculture industry also promotes tourism, with tours through facilities where finfish are raised.

== Community ==
=== Facilities ===
For tourist facilities, Arno Bay has a beachfront caravan park, hotel, general stores, post office, playground and motor garage outlet, however no fuel station. An all-weather boat ramp, with floating pontoon and a refurbished town jetty launching facilities for boat based fishermen.

A number of sporting venues and clubs include a dried-up swamp that serves as a golf course, bowling green, oval, tennis, netball, and squash courts, dirt circuit and in summer yacht racing each Sunday.
