= Verran, South Australia =

Verran South Australia
- Coordinates: 33°51′07″S 136°18′53″E
- Population: 88 (SAL 2016)
- Established: 30 July 1914 (town); 23 December 1998 (locality)
- Abolished: 29 October 1970 (town)
- Postcode(s): 5603
- Elevation: 53 m (174 ft)railway station
- Time zone: ACST (UTC+9:30)
  - Summer (DST): ACST (UTC+10:30)
- Location: 241 km (150 mi) west of Adelaide
- LGA(s): District Council of Cleve
- Region: Eyre Western
- County: Jervois
- State electorate(s): Flinders
- Federal division(s): Grey
Mean max temp	Mean min temp	Annual rainfall
22.6 °C; 73 °F	11.5 °C; 53 °F	357.2 mm 14.1 in
Suburbs around Verran:
Hincks	Rudall; Cleve	Cleve
Hincks	Verran	Arno Bay
Hincks; Wharminda	Wharminda; Port Neill	Arno Bay
- Footnotes: Location; Adjoining localities

Verran is a locality in the Australian state of South Australia located on the Eyre Peninsula about 241 kilometres (150 miles) west of the state capital of Adelaide. Its name is derived from the cadastral unit of the Hundred of Verran, which was named for former Premier John Verran.

Verran began as a government town surveyed during May 1914 and proclaimed by Governor Galway on 30 July 1914. The government town was declared to “cease to exist” on 29 October 1970. Boundaries for the locality were created in December 1998 and include the “ceased Government Town of Verran.”

The Verran Siding School opened in 1913 and closed in 1941. A postal receiving office opened at Verran on 21 June 1912, became a post office in June 1915, and closed on 29 February 1972.

The principal land use within the locality is ‘primary production’ which mainly concerned with "grazing and cropping." It also includes the protected area known as the Verran Tanks Conservation Park.

Verran is located within the federal division of Grey, the state electoral district of Flinders and the local government area of the District Council of Cleve.
