= Caralue Bluff Conservation Park =

Protected area in South Australia

- IUCN category VI (protected area with sustainable use of natural resources)
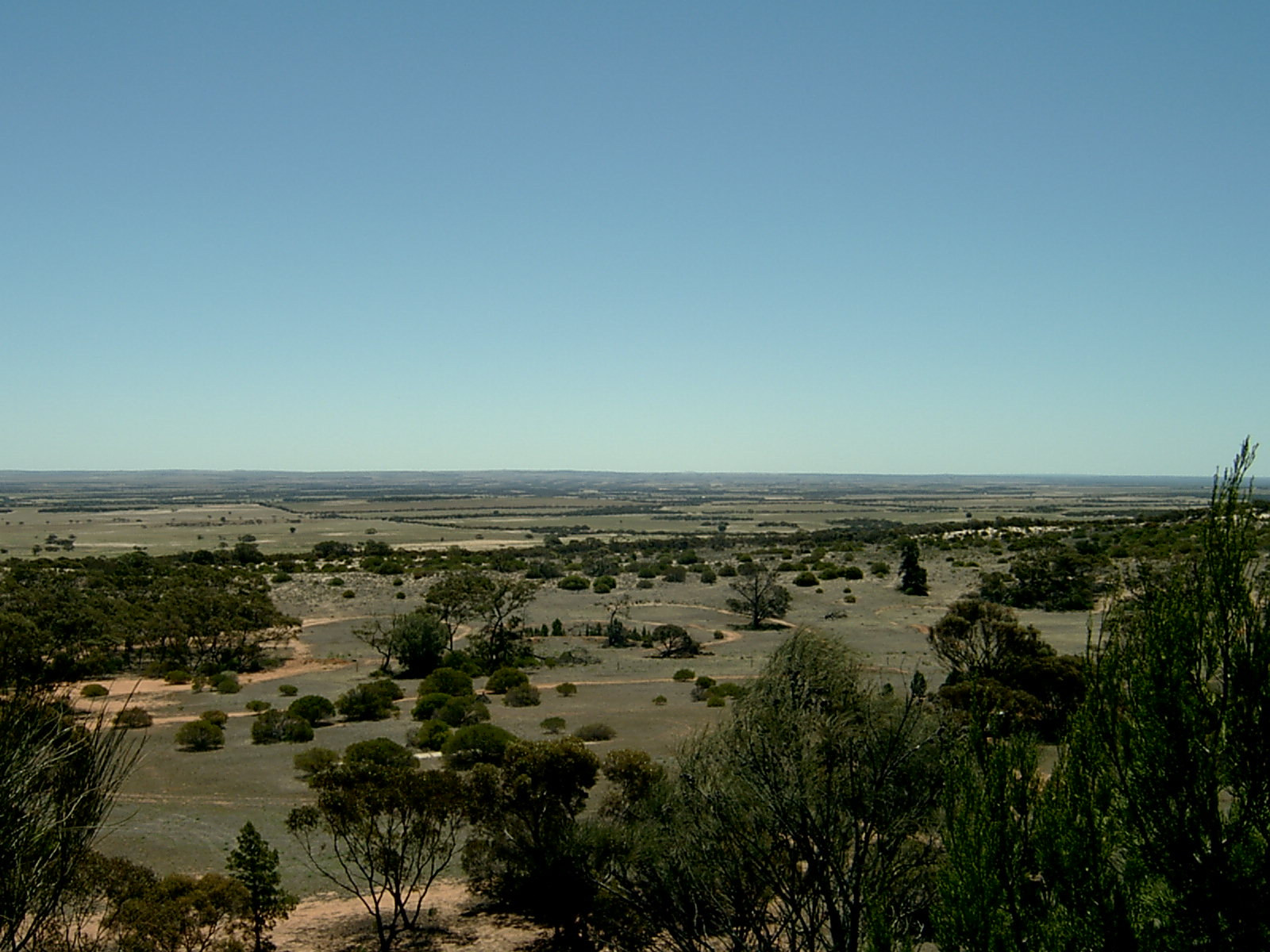
- Caralue Bluff view looking west

- Location within South Australia
- Location: South Australia, Caralue
- Nearest city: Kimba.
- Coordinates: 33.2553°S 136.2046°E
- Area: 21.57 km^{2} (8.33 sq mi)
- Established: 9 December 1993
- Governing body: Department for Environment and Water

Caralue Bluff Conservation Park is a protected area in the Australian state of South Australia located on the Eyre Peninsula in the gazetted locality of Caralue about 24 kilometres (15 mi) south-west of the town centre in Kimba.

The land now within the conservation park first received protected area status on 9 December 1993 as a conservation reserve under the Crown Lands Act 1929 as the Caralue Bluff Conservation Reserve in respect to the following land in the cadastral unit of the Hundred of Caralue - "allotment 2 of Deposited Plan No. 37135". This land was formerly a part of the Caralue Bluff Water Conservation Reserve. On 6 September 2012, the land forming the conservation reserve and an adjacent parcel of land were constituted as the Caralue Bluff Conservation Park under the state's National Parks and Wildlife Act 1972.

Its name was ultimately derived from Caralue Bluff, a feature located to the south-west of the conservation park. As of June 2016, the conservation park covered an area of 21.57 square kilometres (8.33 sq mi).

The conservation park is classified as an IUCN Category VI protected area.

== See also ==
- Protected areas of South Australia
