= Carappee Hill Conservation Park =

Protected area in South Australia

- IUCN category III (natural monument or feature)
- Location within South Australia
- Location: South Australia
- Nearest city: Darke Peake.
- Coordinates: 33.4170°S 136.2628°E
- Area: 8.50 km^{2} (3.28 sq mi)
- Established: 30 August 1973
- Governing body: Department for Environment and Water

Carappee Hill Conservation Park is a protected area in the Australian state of South Australia located on the Eyre Peninsula in the gazetted locality of Darke Peak about 8 kilometres (5.0 mi) north-east of the town centre in Darke Peak.

The conservation park was proclaimed on 30 August 1973 under the state's National Parks and Wildlife Act 1972 in respect to land in section 104 in the cadastral unit of the Hundred of Pascoe which had been dedicated as a water conservation reserve since 1955. As of July 2016, the conservation park covered an area of 8.5 square kilometres (3.3 sq mi).

The conservation park is classified as an IUCN Category III protected area.

== See also ==
- Protected areas of South Australia
