= Rudall, South Australia =

Rudall South Australia
- Coordinates: 33.6904°S 136.2710°E
- Population: 71 (SAL 2021)
- Established: 4 June 1914 (town); 23 December 1998 (locality)
- Postcode(s): 5642
- Elevation: 97 m (318 ft)railway station
- Time zone: ACST (UTC+9:30)
  - Summer (DST): ACST (UTC+10:30)
- LGA(s): District Council of Cleve
- Region: Eyre Western
- County: Jervois
- State electorate(s): Flinders
- Federal division(s): Grey
Mean max temp	Mean min temp	Annual rainfall
22.1 °C; 72 °F	11.4 °C; 53 °F	401.5 mm 15.8 in
Localities around Rudall:
Boonerdo	Kielpa	Campoona
Murlong	Rudall	Cleve
Hinks	Verran	Verran
- Footnotes: Adjoining localities

Rudall is a town and locality in South Australia. It is named for the cadastral Hundred of Rudall, which was named after politician Samuel Rudall.

It is a grain and sheep service centre on the Eyre Peninsula. It is on the Eyre Peninsula Railway between Cummins and Kimba and the Birdseye Highway between Cleve and Lock.

Rudall Centre School opened in 1921 and closed in 1946, while the Hundred of Rudall School opened in 1917 and closed in 1949. A postal receiving office opened at Rudall on 3 January 1914, was upgraded to a post office on 1 January 1921, and became a community mail agent on 10 January 1992. It formerly had a Methodist church.

Rudall is located within the federal division of Grey, the state electoral district of Flinders and the local government area of the District Council of Cleve.

== The government town of Taragoro ==
The town of Taragoro (33°45′34″S 136°17′48″E) which was located about 13 kilometres (8.1 mi) south-east of the town of Rudall on the route of the Eyre Peninsula Railway was proclaimed on 30 July 1914 and was declared to "cease to exist" on 4 February 1960. The former town whose site is located within the locality of Rudall is reported to be named after an Aboriginal word for "small black cormorant."

== See also ==
- Rudall Conservation Park
