= Darke Peak =

- Town
- Coordinates: 33.468410°S 136.200590°E
- Country: Australia
- State: South Australia
- Region: Eyre Western
- LGA: District Council of Cleve
- Location: 577 km (359 mi) West of Adelaide; 161 km (100 mi) North of Port Lincoln
- Established: 4 June 1914 (town); 23 December 1998 (locality)

Government
  - State electorate: Flinders
  - Federal division: Grey
- Elevation: 247 m (810 ft)

Population
  - Total: 90 (SAL 2021)
- Time zone: UTC+9:30 (ACST)
  - Summer (DST): UTC+10:30 (ACST)
- Postcode: 5633
- County: Jervois
- Mean max temp: 22.1 °C (71.8 °F)
- Mean min temp: 11.4 °C (52.5 °F)
- Annual rainfall: 401.5 mm (15.81 in)
Localities around Darke Peak
Caralue	Caralue; Waddikee	Waddikee
Hambidge; Boonerdo	Darke Peak	Jamieson; Campoona
Boonerdo	Kielpa	Campoona

Darke Peak (formerly Carappee) is a small agricultural town located in central Eyre Peninsula, South Australia. The town is the population centre for the surrounding agricultural district and has become a minor historical tourist town. It is situated on Barngarla lands. The J. C. Darke Memorial and Grave, commemorating early European explorer John Charles Darke, is located near the township and is located on the South Australian Heritage Register.

The town has a number of limited facilities, including accommodation, grocery and fuel supplies.

== History ==
The area was in the general vicinity of Nauo and Barngarla land.

The town takes its name from the explorer John Charles Darke, who was injured in a spear attack by Indigenous people while he was climbing nearby Waddikee Rock on 24 October 1844. Waddikee Rock is a sacred site of the Barngarla people. He died the next day and was buried at the foot of the Rock. Governor Grey expressed a wish that some landform in the region of the grave should be named to honour him. In 1865 surveyor Thomas Evans who was performing a trigonometrical survey of the Gawler Ranges and named the 1,564 ft (477 m) high mount, 'Darke's Peak'.

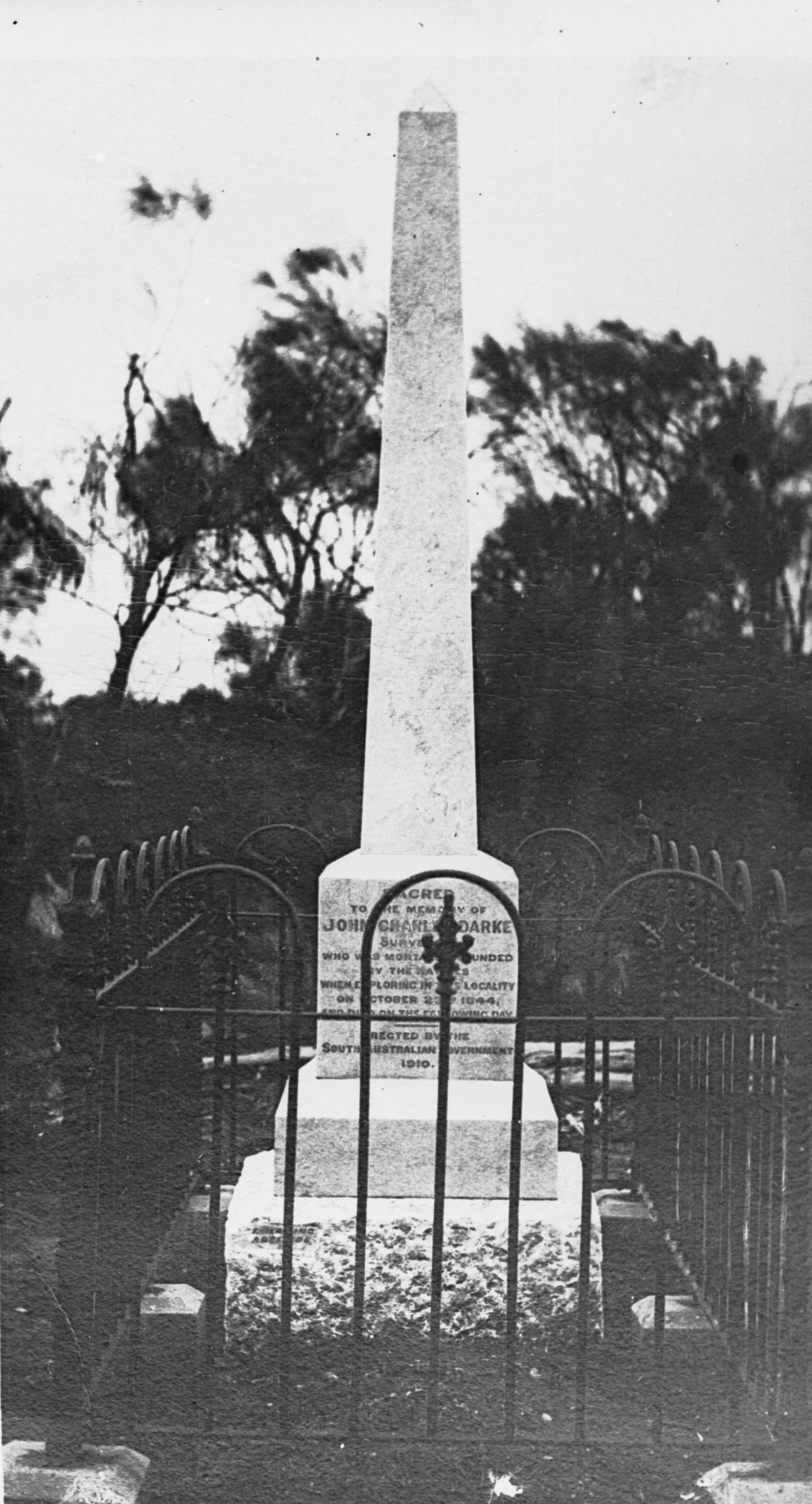
Memorial to John Charles Darke

In 1909, another surveyor, W.G. Evans, reported that he had found bones in a grave and was satisfied they were the remains of Darke. Darke's grave and monument are located on the western side of the range, still standing as a memorial to the first European who explored this area. The memorial was erected by the SA Government in 1910.

The township of Darke Peak was originally proclaimed Carappee in 1914. The town was renamed in 1940 after the peak that bears John Charles Darke's name as further honour to the explorer. A school opened in the town in 1917.

Darke Peak includes Darke Range, Caralue Bluff, Carappee Hill Conservation Park and Carappee Hill in the surrounding area, with Carappee Hill known for being the highest exposed granite rock mass on Eyre Peninsula.

== Economy ==
Darke Peak is predominantly a farming community, with surrounding areas producing cereal crops, with sheep also produced as a backup for when the region experiences poor rainfall. Local farmers have been farming the area for a number of generations, predating the establishment of the town. The farming areas are very similar to other towns across the central Eyre Peninsula, growing much the same crops under similar climate conditions.

Tourism is a minor component of the towns economy, with Darke's Grave, The Darke Range and various tourist drives the main attractions. Tourist information is present at The Peak Stop shelter.

== Facilities ==
Darke Peak has a hotel which dates back to the early days of the settlement and offers accommodation and meals.

Sporting facilities in the town include tennis and netball courts, oval, playground, swimming pool and a golf course, with some sports teams competing in local leagues.

== Governance ==
Darke Peak is located in the local government area of District Council of Cleve, the State Electoral district of Flinders and the Federal Division of Grey.
