= Cleve, South Australia =

Cleve
- Town
- Coordinates: 33°42′0″S 136°29′0″E
- Country: Australia
- State: South Australia
- Region: Eyre Western
- LGA: District Council of Cleve
- Location: 527 km (327 mi) North West of Adelaide
- Established: 1879

Government
  - State electorate: Flinders
  - Federal division: Grey
- Elevation: 196 m (643 ft)

Population
  - Total: 796 (UCL 2021)
- Postcode: 5640
- County: Jervois
- Mean max temp: 22.0 °C (71.6 °F)
- Mean min temp: 11.3 °C (52.3 °F)
- Annual rainfall: 964 mm (38.0 in)
Localities around Cleve
Campoona	Campoona; Mangalo	Miltalie
Campoona; Rudall	Cleve	Cowell
Rudall	Rudall; Verran; Arno Bay	Cowell

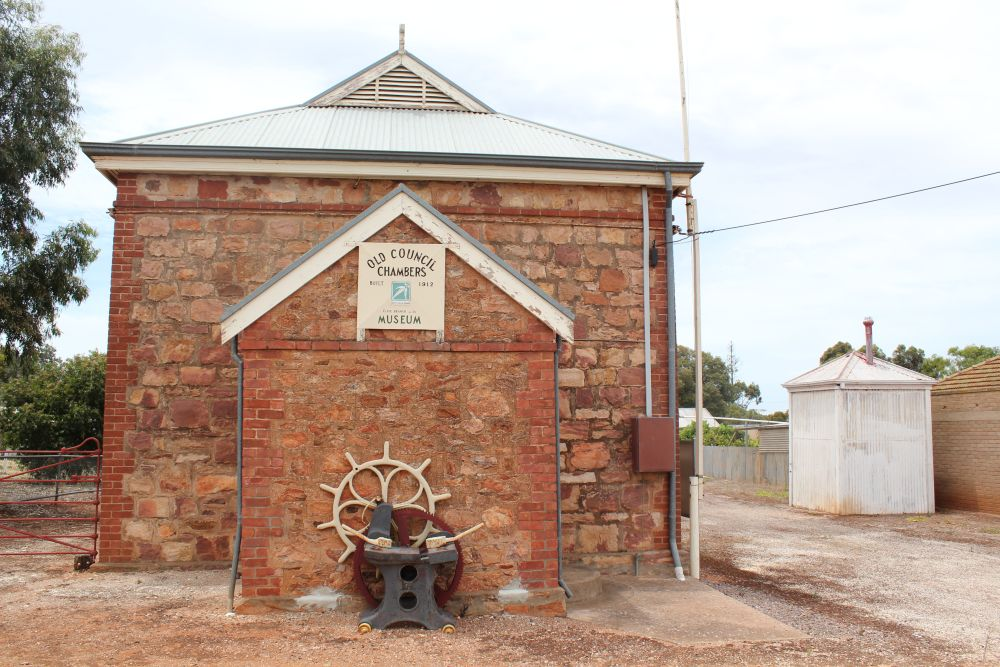
Cleve Agricultural & Folk Museum in the old council building.

Cleve is a small agriculturally based town on Central Eyre Peninsula in South Australia. It is 226 km southwest of Port Augusta and 143 km north of Port Lincoln. At the 2006 census, Cleve had a population of 738. The town has its origins in the 1850s, with the town established some twenty years later.

Cleve is a hub for farmers and suppliers on the Eyre Peninsula and hosts a field day held each second year to offer the newest in farming equipment and stock.

== History ==
The first European settlers in the area were the three McKechnie brothers; James, Peter and Donald who arrived in 1853. The first European woman arrived in 1862; a wife of one of the brothers. They established a sheep run 43 km from the current day site of Cleve and continued living there until 1869, when Peter and Donald died, leaving James to return to his homeland of Scotland. The run was sold to George Melrose in 1873, and he had great initial success, shearing 30 000 sheep in his first year. This was not to last though, as dingos decimated his flock in the following years. Melrose was also the first to report rabbits on the Eyre Peninsula, an indicator of the troubles they would cause in the future.

In 1878, the current site of the town was inspected and surveyed, in anticipation of creating a new town to serve the growing wool and crop industries which were rapidly expanding. During this period, Arno Bay became the port for the products grown in Cleve and also underwent expansion.

The town was officially gazetted on 6 March 1879 in a square grid design meant to imitate the city of Adelaide. The main street and 1st to 5th street were neatly enclosed by North, East, South and West Terraces, and outside of this lay parklands, a school reserve and a golf course. The new town was named after Cleve House, the county seat in Devon, England of the Snow family, cousins of Sir William Jervois who was the Governor of South Australia at the time. The Cleve school was opened seven years later in 1886, and would go on to become a recognised instructor in dryland farming.

Cleve has maintained its position as a leading producer of both grain and wool since the establishment, with other ventures such as copper mining in the area having little success.

=== Heritage listings ===
Cleve has a number of heritage-listed sites, including:

- Cleve-Cowell Road: Sims Farm Homstead
- off Cleve Road: Yeldulknie Cottage
- off Cleve Road: Yeldulknie Weir

== Geography ==
Cleve is located in the central east Eyre Peninsula, a large triangular body of land in South Australia. Many of the areas geological and geographical features are responsible for the use of the land and types of natural vegetation present. The landscape has been heavily modified since European settlement and now is predominantly farming land, with patches of native scrub in places. The Cleve Hills are a major topographical feature of the region and have areas of preserved vegetation in their bounds.

=== Geology and Pedology ===
The town of Cleve lies on an ancient bedrock that has undergone high grade metamorphism, with the area characterised by schists, gneisses and granites in a formation known as the Hutchison Group. These strata were laid down in the Proterozoic, some 600-2300 million years ago. The area underwent deformation during the orogeny events that shaped Australia. Just south of Cleve marks an unconformity with recent Quaternary alluvial and colluvial sediments of the Piedmont Group which were deposited less than 1 million years ago.

The soils around Cleve are heavily tied to the geology of the area, with Cleve having a clay overlain by sandy loam soils in the hills and on most slopes in the area. This soil is often referred to as 'Cleve soil' or 'Nobby's Hill's soil'. The soils are highly productive when they are deep enough to hold enough moisture, but are particularly susceptible to erosion, especially in steeper inclines. There is also a strong calcareous component to much of the areas soils, especially away from the slopes.

=== Climate ===
Cleve has a hot mediterranean climate (Köppen: Csa/Csb); with very warm, dry summers and mild, somewhat wetter winters. Temperatures vary throughout the year: with average maxima between 28.3 °C (82.9 °F) in January to 15.3 °C (59.5 °F) in July; and average minima between 16.1 °C (61.0 °F) in February to 7.2 °C (45.0 °F) in July. Annual precipitation is somewhat low: averaging 402.2 mm (15.83 in), between 108.4 precipitation days- primarily concentrated in winter. The rainfall is generally not enough to cause any flooding, and certainly not within the bounds of the town. The Cleve hills, however are the catchment areas for Salt Creek, and localised flooding in the valleys has been reported. Extreme temperatures have ranged from 46.0 °C (114.8 °F) on the 24th of January 2019 to 0.2 °C (32.4 °F) on 13 June 1972.

Climate data for Cleve (33º42'00"S, 136º29'24"E, 193 m AMSL) (1939-2024 normals, extremes 1957-2024, rainfall to 1896)
Month	Jan	Feb	Mar	Apr	May	Jun	Jul	Aug	Sep	Oct	Nov	Dec	Year
Record high °C (°F)	46.0 (114.8)	44.6 (112.3)	43.2 (109.8)	38.1 (100.6)	30.5 (86.9)	26.8 (80.2)	27.6 (81.7)	30.2 (86.4)	35.9 (96.6)	39.7 (103.5)	43.3 (109.9)	45.9 (114.6)	46.0 (114.8)
Mean daily maximum °C (°F)	28.3 (82.9)	27.7 (81.9)	25.9 (78.6)	22.8 (73.0)	19.0 (66.2)	16.0 (60.8)	15.3 (59.5)	16.7 (62.1)	19.6 (67.3)	22.4 (72.3)	24.9 (76.8)	26.8 (80.2)	22.1 (71.8)
Mean daily minimum °C (°F)	15.8 (60.4)	16.1 (61.0)	14.8 (58.6)	12.4 (54.3)	10.0 (50.0)	8.0 (46.4)	7.2 (45.0)	7.4 (45.3)	8.6 (47.5)	10.3 (50.5)	12.3 (54.1)	14.1 (57.4)	11.4 (52.5)
Record low °C (°F)	7.2 (45.0)	8.3 (46.9)	6.8 (44.2)	4.0 (39.2)	2.1 (35.8)	0.2 (32.4)	0.3 (32.5)	0.6 (33.1)	1.5 (34.7)	2.5 (36.5)	4.1 (39.4)	6.1 (43.0)	0.2 (32.4)
Average precipitation mm (inches)	16.9 (0.67)	22.1 (0.87)	21.5 (0.85)	28.6 (1.13)	40.0 (1.57)	47.3 (1.86)	45.5 (1.79)	48.2 (1.90)	41.8 (1.65)	36.0 (1.42)	28.0 (1.10)	26.4 (1.04)	402.2 (15.83)
Average precipitation days (≥ 0.2 mm)	4.0	4.2	5.4	7.7	11.7	13.6	14.5	14.4	11.3	9.3	6.6	5.7	108.4
Average afternoon relative humidity (%)	39	42	44	47	55	61	60	55	48	43	39	40	48
Average dew point °C (°F)	10.3 (50.5)	10.7 (51.3)	9.9 (49.8)	8.1 (46.6)	7.8 (46.0)	6.5 (43.7)	6.0 (42.8)	5.4 (41.7)	5.4 (41.7)	5.7 (42.3)	6.7 (44.1)	8.8 (47.8)	7.6 (45.7)
Source: Bureau of Meteorology (1939-2024 normals, extremes 1957-2024, rainfall to 1896)

=== Flora and Fauna ===
The most common vegetation association in the area is classified as Open Scrub (Mallee/Broombush), which is typical of most of the mid eastern Eyre Peninsula, consisting of Eucalyptus socialis (summer red mallee), Eucalyptus incrassata (ridge fruited mallee) and Eucalyptus leptophylla (narrow-leafed mallee), with a Melaleuca uncinata (broombush) understorey.

The southern Cleve hills show a greater variety of vegetation, with Open Scrub (Mallee/Saltbush), typically containing Eucalyptus porosa (mallee box), Eucalyptus gracilis and Eucalyptus oleosa with an understorey of Atriplex vesicaria (bladder saltbush).

Low Open Forest associations of sheoaks (Allocasuarina verticillata) with a varied understorey of Acacia species, native grasses and heath species are also found in the hills, as are the Blue gum woodlands which occur predominantly in the valleys of the Cleve Hills and along creeklines on the adjacent plains.

The native fauna associated with the region consisted of euros and western grey kangaroos which were commonplace until land clearing and the introduction of pest species such as rabbits and foxes.

== Economy ==
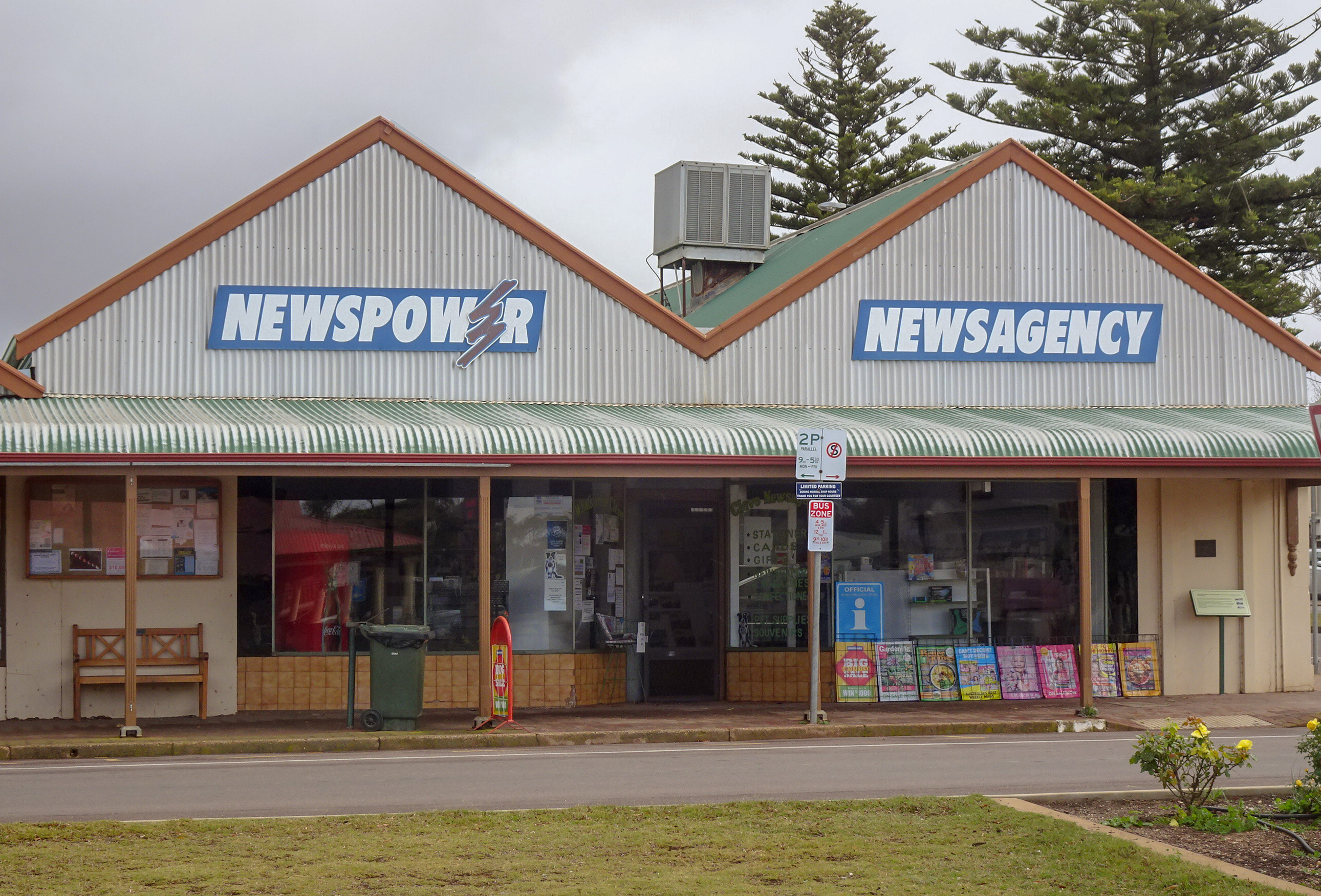
Cleve Local Newsagent

The economy of Cleve is heavily tied to agriculture, and therefore rainfall. The most common products of the areas farms are grain of a number of cereal crops and wool from sheep. Due to Cleve having such a low rainfall, dryland farming techniques have been applied with success, and the town school integrates the techniques in agriculture courses.

The town has a number of retail outlets including supermarket, clothing, shoes, art & craft supplies, banking facilities, professional & medical services, butcher, service industries, post office, rural supplies, hotel, mechanical & RAA services, news agency, garden centre and a pharmacy.

Tourism plays a very minor part in Cleve, with a number of events including the 'Eyre Peninsula Field Days' and a variety of other annual events attracting mainly farming minded tourists. A number of attractions within the town including murals, parks and Ticklebelly Hill which overlooks Cleve.

== Community ==
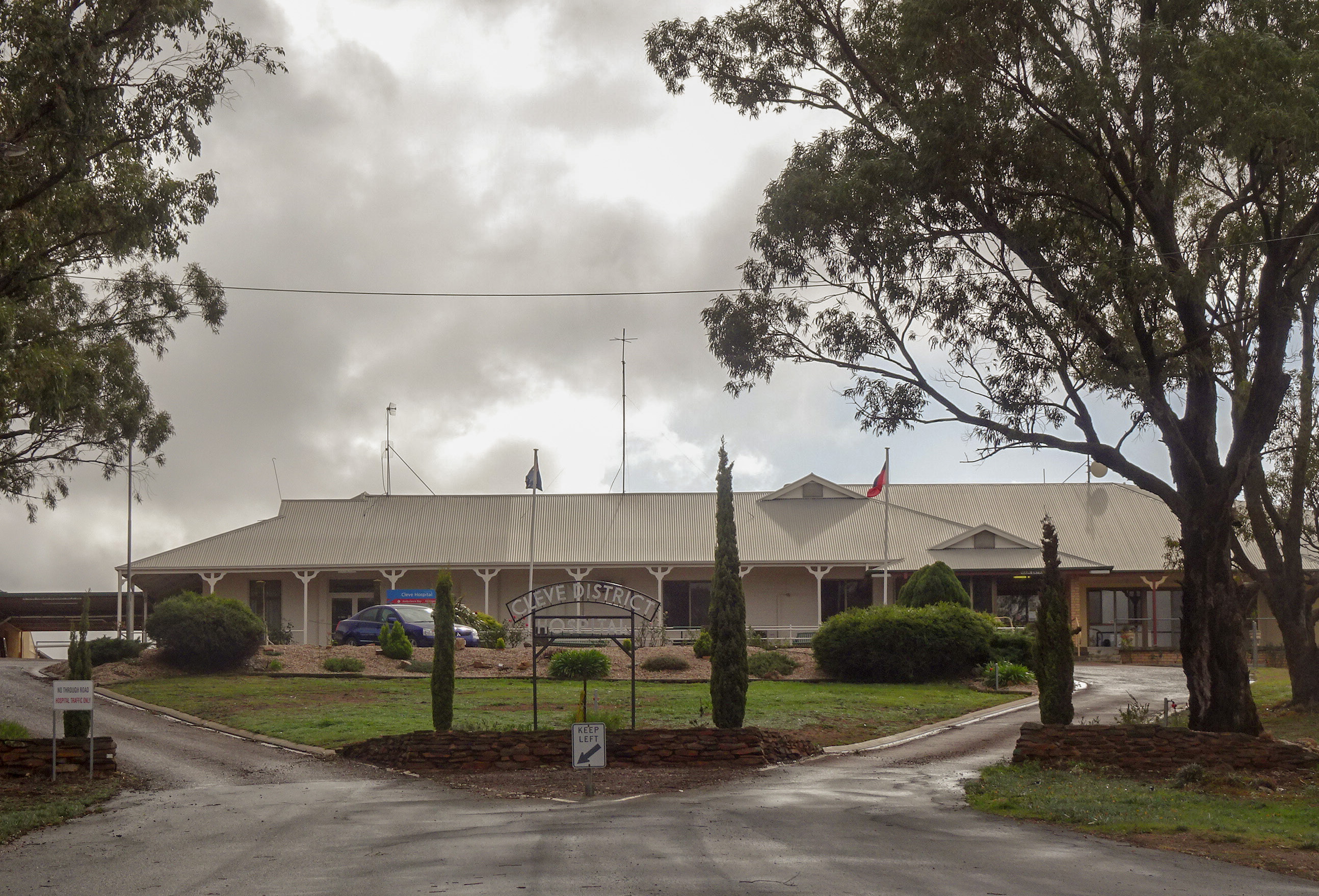
Cleve District Hospital and aged care facility

Cleve has a number of community based facilities and groups established, relating to health, education, sport and culture. In health, Cleve has a modern 20 bed accredited Australia Council & Health Care Standards hospital servicing Cleve District with residential general practitioners & physiotherapist with a number of visiting specialists.

The Eyre Peninsula Field Days are a three-day-long field day held in Cleve every second week of August in even numbered years. Other annual events include the agricultural show and Christmas pageant

=== Media ===
The area's regional newspaper, the Eyre Peninsula Tribune, has its headquarters on Main Street in Cleve. It has been published weekly since March 1911, and services the surrounding region.

=== Education ===
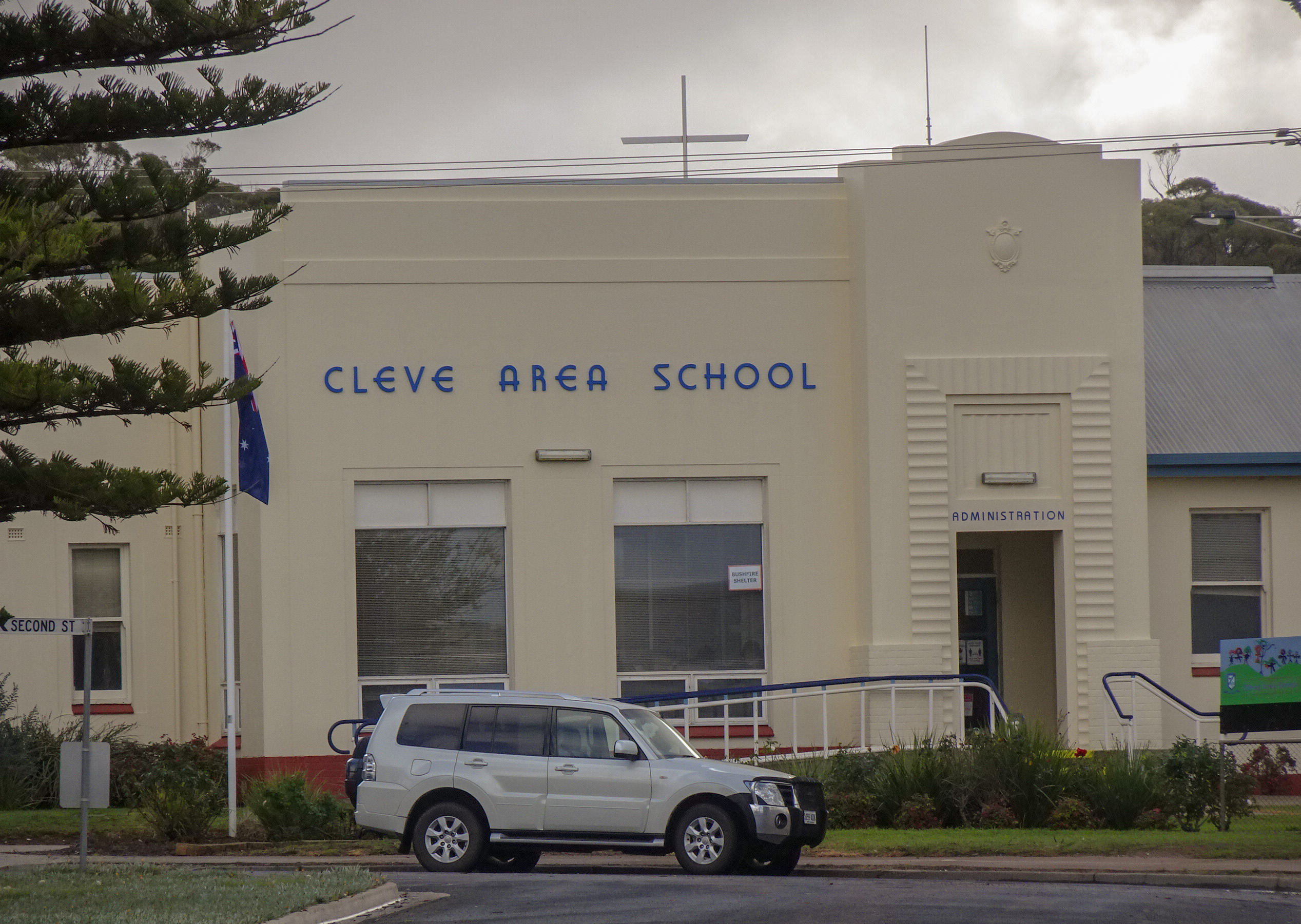
Cleve Area School.

The town is well served in education, with childcare, an area school and TAFE campus (a tiny room on main street). Cleve Area School is a major agricultural school in South Australia, specialising in dry land agriculture. In 2005, some students scored 20/20 in agricultural subjects. The school won the South Australian Westpac Landcare Education Award in 2005 for its exemplary integration of good land management practices into its Agriculture curriculum. Cleve Area School was an Australian finalist in the Westpac Landcare Education Awards for 2006.

=== Sport ===
Cleve has a wide array of sporting facilities and clubs with basketball, lawn bowls, cricket, football, golf - scrapes, netball, pistol, pony & hunt club, softball, swimming pool and tennis all provided for as well as a dartboard in the drop in centre. A number of these sports compete in local leagues as well.

=== Demographics ===
In the 2006 Census, there were 738 persons usually resident in Cleve: 49.6% of which were males and 50.4% were females. Of the total population in Cleve 0.4% were Indigenous persons. It was found that 19.3% of the population usually resident in the town were children aged between 0–14 years, and 33.1% were persons aged 55 years and over. The median age of persons in Cleve was 41 years, compared with 37 years for persons in Australia

In the 2006 census, 93.5% of people were Australian citizens, 3.6% were born overseas. 90.8% of people stated they were born in Australia. Other common responses within Cleve were: England 1.9%, Zimbabwe 0.5%, Scotland 0.5%, Italy 0.5% and Ethiopia 0.4% (3 people). Update: The 3 Ethiopians have since moved to Cowell. Further Update: The 3 Ethiopians have now moved back.

The most common responses for religious affiliation were Uniting Church 26.0%, No Religion 15.9%, Catholic 15.1%, Anglican 13.1% and Lutheran 9.6%.

=== Government ===
Cleve is today the base of the District Council of Cleve. It is in the state electoral district of Flinders and the federal Division of Grey.

== Transport ==
Cleve does not lie on either of Eyre Peninsula's main two highways, but lies on the intersection of the aptly named Arno Bay-Cleve and Cowell roads. Both are sealed, although alternate ways may be taken on unsealed dirt roads.

As for getting to Cleve, automobile is the most common option, although a regular coach (Stateliner) service operates between Cleve and a number of other Eyre Peninsula towns including Port Lincoln. Cleve can be accessed from Adelaide using these services as well.
