= Laura =

Laura may refer to:

== People and fictional characters ==
- Laura (given name), including lists of people and fictional characters with the name
- Laura, muse of Petrarch's poetry
- Laura, the British code name for the World War I Belgian spy Marthe Cnockaert

== Places ==
=== Australia ===
- Laura, Queensland, a town on the Cape York Peninsula
- Laura, South Australia, a town
- Laura Bay, a bay on Eyre Peninsula
- Laura River (Queensland)
- Laura River (Western Australia)

=== Italy ===
- Laura (Capaccio), a village of the municipality of Capaccio, Campania
- Laura, Crespina Lorenzana, a village in Tuscany

=== United States ===
- Laura, Illinois, an unincorporated community
- Laura, Kentucky, an unincorporated community
- Laura, Missouri, an unincorporated community
- Laura, Ohio, a village

=== Elsewhere ===
- Laura, Saskatchewan, Canada, a hamlet
- Laura, Marshall Islands, a town
- Laura, Silesian Voivodeship, Poland, a village
- Laura River (Romania)
- 467 Laura, an asteroid

== Arts and entertainment ==
=== Art ===
- Laura (Giorgione), a 1506 painting by the Italian Renaissance master Giorgione

=== Films ===
- Laura (1944 film), an American film noir directed by Otto Preminger and starring Gene Tierney
- Laura (1968 film), an American television film
- Laura (1979 film), a French romantic drama film
- Laura (2024 film), an Indonesian drama film

=== Literature ===
- Laura (novel), a detective novel by Vera Caspary
- Laura: A Novel You Will Never Forget, a novel by Irish Minister for Justice Alan Shatter
- Laura, Voyage dans le cristal, an 1864 George Sand novel

=== Music ===
==== Bands ====
- Laura (band), an Australian post-rock band
- Oh Laura, a Swedish indie band formerly known as Laura

==== Albums ====
- Laura (Laura Pausini album), 1994
- Laura (Menudo album), 1978
- Laura, a 2004 album by Troy Gregory

==== Songs ====
- "Laura" (1945 song), a song by David Raksin and Johnny Mercer adapted from the 1944 film's theme
- "Laura" (Bat for Lashes song)
- "Laura" (Billy Joel song), a song by Billy Joel from the 1982 album The Nylon Curtain
- "Laura" (Scissor Sisters song), 2003
- "Laura (What's He Got That I Ain't Got)", a 1976 song by Kenny Rogers
- "Laura", a 1977 song by the Catalan singer-songwriter Lluís Llach
- "Laura", a 1987 song by Fields of the Nephilim
- "Laura", a song by the Celtic-Punk band Flogging Molly
- "Laura", a song by indie rock group Girls
- "Laura", a 1986 song composed by Jean-Jacques Goldman
- "Laura", a song by Nick Heyward from Haircut 100 in 1985
- "Laura", a song performed by Billy Joel on his album The Nylon Curtain
- "Laura", a song by the British shoegazing band Lush
- "Laura", a song by the tejano band Mazz
- "Laura", a song by Jimmy Nail in 1992
- "Laura", a song by Ween from the 1991 album The Pod
- "Laura," a parody of the 1945 song performed by Spike Jones and His Other Orchestra

=== Television ===
- "Laura" (Fear the Walking Dead), an episode of the American television series Fear the Walking Dead
- Laura (TV series), a TV program hosted by Laura Bozzo (also known as Laura en América, Laura sin censura, Laura en acción, and Laura de todos)
- Laura (The Morning Show), an episode of the American television series The Morning Show
- "Laura", an episode of the television show Magnum, P.I., guest starring Frank Sinatra
- A Portrait of Murder (later retitled Laura), an American television episode for The 20th Century-Fox Hour

== Ships ==
- SS Laura, a number of steamships with this name
- HMS Laura (1806), a Royal Navy schooner
- Laura (1835 steamboat), an American steamboat

== Other ==
- List of storms named Laura, various tropical cyclones
- Aichi E11A, World War II Japanese Navy flying boat codenamed "Laura" by the Allies
- Škoda Laura, a small family car
- Laura Airport, Laura, Queensland, Australia
- Laura (clothing retailer), a chain of Canadian women's fashions
- Laura (crustacean), a genus of maxillopoda
- Laura potato, a cultivar of potato
- Laura or lavra (Greek: Λαύρα, Cyrillic: Лавра), a cluster of cells or caves used by hermits, loosely connected into a community
- Laura (magazine), a German women's weekly magazine

== See also ==
- Laure (disambiguation)
- Lauria (disambiguation)
- Laurie (disambiguation)
- Lora (disambiguation)
- Lara (disambiguation)
