= Laura Bay =

- Location in South Australia
- Location: South Australia
- Coordinates: 32°14′42″S 133°48′43″E
- Type: Bay
- Etymology: Laura, daughter of Bloomfield Douglas
- Part of: Great Australian Bight
- Basin countries: Australia
- Designation: Nuyts Archipelago Marine Park
- Max. length: about 1 kilometre (0.62 mi) (west-east)
- Max. width: about 1 kilometre (0.62 mi) (north-south)
- Settlements: Laura Bay

Laura Bay is a bay in the Australian state of South Australia on the west coast of Eyre Peninsula, about 15 kilometres (9.3 mi) southeast of Ceduna.

Laura Bay is an inlet that opens into the northern end of the larger Smoky Bay, and which is about 4.5 kilometres (2.8 mi) northeast of the headland of Cape D'Estrees. Its depth is less than 2 metres (6 ft 7 in) at chart datum. It is described as:

. . . a small semicircular south facing bay, 1 km wide at the mouth, widening to 2 km inside. It is very protected from ocean waves and usually calm conditions prevail at the three shelly beaches, each fronted by a few hundred metres wide sand and tidal flats, and bordered and backed by stands of low mangroves.

The bay was reportedly named for Laura Douglas, the daughter of William Bloomfield Douglas who surveyed the bay for the Government of South Australia in 1858.

Laura Bay was used as a port facility from at least 1894 to at least 1937. Farm produce was delivered there from as far away as 30 kilometres (19 mi), onto watercraft known as lighters, which then moved it to vessels anchored in deeper water. In 1911, a jetty of about 14.3 metres (47 ft) length was built and was used until 1937, when it was demolished.

Since 2012, the bay has been part of the protected area of Nuyts Archipelago Marine Park.

== See also ==
- Laura (disambiguation)
