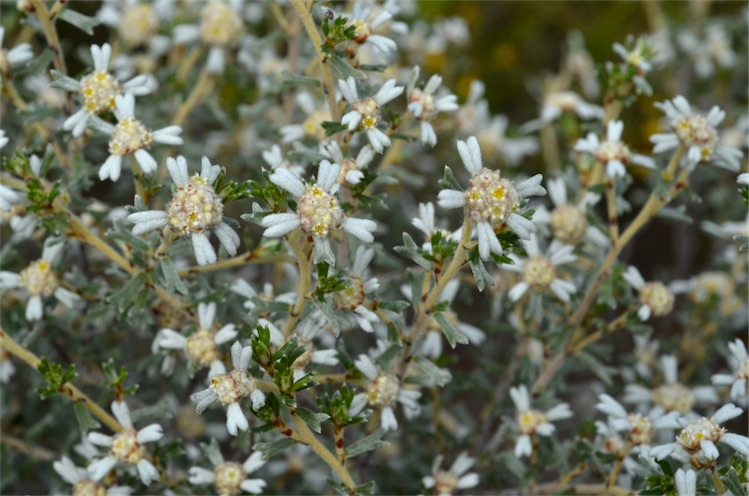
- Subspecies bifidum

Scientific classification
- Kingdom: Plantae
- Clade: Tracheophytes
- Clade: Angiosperms
- Clade: Eudicots
- Clade: Rosids
- Order: Rosales
- Family: Rhamnaceae
- Genus: Spyridium
- Species: S. bifidum

Binomial name
- Spyridium bifidum (F.Muell.) F.Muell. ex Benth.

= Spyridium bifidum =

Species of shrub

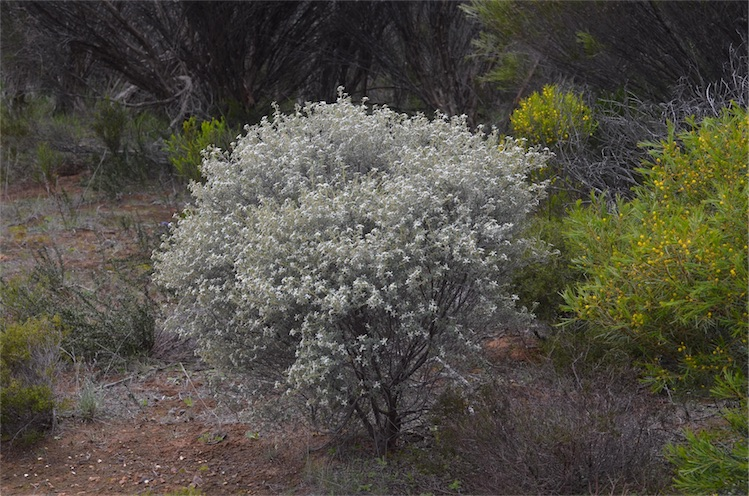
Habit near Cleve, South Australia

Spyridium bifidum, commonly known as forked spyridium, is a species of flowering plant in the family Rhamnaceae and is endemic to South Australia. It is an erect shrub with densely softly-hairy young stems, wedge-shaped to linear leaves sometimes with a two-lobed tip, and densely woolly heads of white-velvety flowers.

== Description ==
Spyridium bifidum is an erect shrub that typically grows to a height of up to 2 m (6 ft 7 in), its young stems densely covered with simple and star-shaped hairs. The leaves are wedge-shaped to linear, 3.2–13 mm (0.13–0.51 in) long and 1–5 mm (0.039–0.197 in) wide on a petiole 0.7–1.5 mm (0.028–0.059 in) long. The edges of the leaves are rolled under, the tip is sometimes forked with two lobes, both surfaces are covered with soft, star-shaped hairs, and there are triangular to narrowly egg-shaped stipules at the base. The more or less spherical heads of "flowers" are 8–12 mm (0.31–0.47 in) wide, the individual flowers more or less sessile and silky-hairy. Each head is surrounded by 4 or 5 velvety, white leaves, each more or less divided into two. The fruit is a light brown capsule 2.2–2.5 mm (0.087–0.098 in) long.

== Taxonomy ==
This species was first formally described in 1855 by Ferdinand von Mueller who gave it the name Trymalium bifidum in his Definitions of rare or hitherto undescribed Australian plants. In 1863, George Bentham changed the name to Spyridium bifidum in Flora Australiensis. The specific epithet (bifidum) refers to the forked leaves of this species.

In 2012, Jürgen Kellermann and William Robert Barker described two subspecies of Spyridium bifidum in the journal Muelleria and the names are accepted by the Australian Plant Census:

- Spyridium bifidum (F.Muell.) F.Muell. ex Benth. subsp. bifidum has wedge-shaped to heart-shaped leaves with a Y-shaped tip;
- Spyridium bifidum subsp. wanillae Kellermann & W.R.Barker has narrowly lance-shaped to narrowly oblong or linear leaves that are rarely forked at the tip.

== Distribution and habitat ==
Spyridium bifidum grows in mallee shrubland on the Marble Range and on the hills to the east of Edillilie, the two subspecies separated by only 5 or 6 km (3.1 or 3.7 mi). Subspecies bifidum is restricted to the Marble Range, and flowers from June to September, subspecies wanillae is mostly found around Wanilla on the Eyre Peninsula, and flowers in July.
