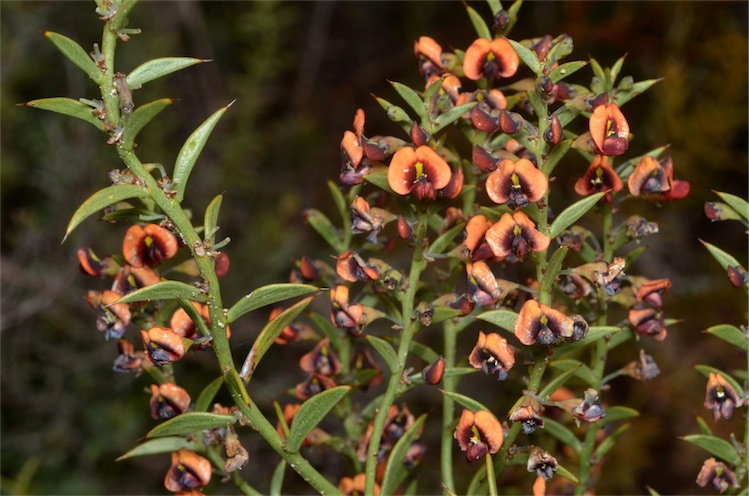
- In Wanilla Land Settlement Conservation Park

Scientific classification
- Kingdom: Plantae
- Clade: Tracheophytes
- Clade: Angiosperms
- Clade: Eudicots
- Clade: Rosids
- Order: Fabales
- Family: Fabaceae
- Subfamily: Faboideae
- Genus: Daviesia
- Species: D. asperula

Binomial name
- Daviesia asperula Crisp

= Daviesia asperula =

Species of flowering plant

Daviesia asperula is a species of flowering plant in the family Fabaceae and is endemic to South Australia. It is a compact or spreading shrub with often crowded, flattened, tapering or curved, sharply pointed phyllodes, and orange-yellow and red flowers.

== Description ==
Daviesia asperula is a compact or spreading shrub that typically grows to a height of up to 2 m (6 ft 7 in). Its leaves are reduced to often crowded flattened, tapering or curved, sharply-pointed phyllodes, 5–25 mm (0.20–0.98 in) wide and 1–4.5 mm (0.039–0.177 in) wide. The flowers are arranged in groups of two or three in leaf axils on a peduncle up to 1 mm (0.039 in) long, each flower on a pedicel 1–2 mm (0.039–0.079 in) long. The five sepals are 2.5–3.0 mm (0.098–0.118 in) long and joined at the base, forming a bell-shaped tube with short lobes. The standard petal is broadly egg-shaped with a notched tip, yellow-orange with a red base and 7–8 mm (0.28–0.31 in) long and wide, the wings yellow-orange and about 5.5 mm (0.22 in) long and the keel orange-red and about 4.5 mm (0.18 in) long. Flowering occurs from August to October and the fruit is a slightly flattened triangular pod 10–14 mm (0.39–0.55 in) long.

== Taxonomy and naming ==
Daviesia asperula was first formally described in 1995 by Michael Crisp in Australian Systematic Botany from specimens collected by Betty Phillips near Rocky River on Kangaroo Island in 1965. The specific epithet (asperula) means "slightly rough", referring to the branchlets and phyllodes.

In the same journal, Crisp described two subspecies and the names are accepted by the Australian Plant Census:

- Daviesia asperula Crisp subsp. asperula has phyllodes that are broadest at or near the base;
- Daviesia asperula Crisp subsp. obliqua Crisp has curved phyllodes that are broadest at or beyond the middle.

== Distribution and habitat ==
This species of pea mainly grows in mallee or open forest in poor soils on the Eyre and Fleurieu Peninsulas and on Kangaroo Island in South Australia.
