= Barwell Conservation Park =

Protected area in South Australia

- IUCN category VI (protected area with sustainable use of natural resources)
- Location within South Australia
- Location: South Australia
- Nearest city: Lock
- Coordinates: 33.4804°S 135.5613°E
- Area: 101.42 km^{2} (39.16 sq mi)
- Established: 31 March 1988
- Governing body: Department for Environment and Water

Barwell Conservation Park is a protected area in the Australian state of South Australia located on Eyre Peninsula in the gazetted localities of Palkagee and Polda about 140 kilometres (87 mi) north of Port Lincoln and about 15 kilometres (9.3 mi) west of Lock.

The conservation park occupies a parcel of land located on the boundaries of the hundreds of the Barwell and McIntosh to the immediate west of the Tod Highway and the immediate north of the Birdseye Highway.

The conservation park was proclaimed on 31 March 1988 under the state's National Parks and Wildlife Act 1972 (NPW Act) in respect to the following parcel of land located at the northern end of the Hundred of Barwell - Section 30. It was "proclaimed to conserve a large block of remnant mallee vegetation on the Eyre Peninsula". On 22 March 2007, the Barwell Conservation Reserve which occupied the crown land to the immediate north in the Hundred of McIntosh was added to the conservation park. The Barwell Conservation Reserve itself was dedicated as a conservation reserve on 11 November 1993 under the state's Crown Lands Act 1929 and consisted of the following parcel of land - "allotment 100 of Deposited Plan No. 34676 and sections 6 and 7 Hundred of McIntosh". The conservation park was constituted to permit access under the state's Mining Act 1971 while the land formerly occupied by the Barwell Conservation Reserve was also constituted to permit access under the state's Petroleum Act 2000.

Its name is derived from the Hundred of Barwell. The name of the original protected area was proposed to be the Polda Conservation Park but this was not approved by Geographical Names Board.

As of 2007, the Barwell Conservation Park was reported as including the following "mallee communities" - "Eucalyptus diversifolia (coastal white mallee) open mallee community and the Eucalyptus porosa (mallee box) mallee community". The conservation park included two plant species of conservation significance listed under both the Australian Environment Protection and Biodiversity Conservation Act 1999 (EPBC Act) and the (NPW Act) - the metallic sun-orchid (Thelymitra epipactoides) and the west coast mintbush (Prostanthera calycina), and two species listed only the (NPW Act) - the hairy shepherd's-purse ( Microlepidium pilosulum) and the rasp daisy-bush (Olearia picridifolia).

Also, 35 species of native bird have been observed within the conservation park including the following species of conservation significance that were listed in 2007 on both the (EPBC Act) and the (NPW Act) - the chestnut quail-thrush and the malleefowl.

As of 2007, there was no access for visitors into the interior of the conservation park and nor were there any plans to create such access.

The conservation park is classified as an IUCN Category VI protected area.

== See also ==
- Protected areas of South Australia
