= Munyaroo Conservation Park =

Protected area in South Australia

- IUCN category VI (protected area with sustainable use of natural resources)
- Location within South Australia
- Location: South Australia
- Nearest city: Cowell
- Coordinates: 33°23′28″S 137°17′38″E
- Area: 201.39 km^{2} (77.76 sq mi)
- Established: 13 October 1977
- Governing body: Department for Environment & Water

Munyaroo Conservation Park is a protected area in the Australian state of South Australia in the gazetted locality of Midgee located on the east coast of the Eyre Peninsula about 36 kilometres (22 miles) south south-west of Whyalla and 35 kilometres (22 miles) east north-east of Cowell.

The conservation park consists of three separate blocks of land - two adjoin the coastline with Spencer Gulf respectively immediately south of Muminnie Beach and Plank Point and the third being located to the west on the east side of the Lincoln Highway.

The conservation park was proclaimed under the National Parks and Wildlife Act 1972 on 13 October 1977. On 20 August 2009, the Munyaroo Conservation Reserve which have been dedicated as a conservation reserve on 11 November 1993 under the state's Crown Lands Act 1929 was added to the conservation park. The conservation park was constituted to permit access under the state's Mining Act 1971 to its west and south portions only.

The land protected by the conservation park was considered in 2014 by its managing authority to be significant for the following reasons:

Munyaroo Conservation Park (20 139 ha) consists of three separate areas in close proximity to each other on the Spencer Gulf coastline. They provide an important habitat link between the coastal vegetation and inland mallee of the peninsula. The two large coastal blocks include low impact sandy beaches with an intertidal zone of mangrove and samphire communities. These communities provide habitat for shorebirds such as plovers, terns and the Sooty Oystercatcher which is listed as rare under the National Parks and Wildlife Act 1972. Behind the coastal dune system are low open woodlands of Western Myall and False Sandalwood, with a Bluebush and Bladder Saltbush understorey. The mallee and saltbush associations contain populations of the Yellow Swainson-pea which is listed as vulnerable under the National Parks and Wildlife Act and the Dwarf Four-toed Slider which is listed as rare under the act.

The conservation park is classified as an IUCN Category VI protected area.
