= Laura Bay Conservation Park =

Protected area in South Australia

- IUCN category III (natural monument or feature)
- Location within South Australia
- Location: South Australia
- Nearest city: Ceduna.
- Coordinates: 32°14′33″S 133°49′55″E
- Area: 2.73 km^{2} (1.05 sq mi)
- Established: 15 February 1973
- Governing body: Department for Environment and Water
- Website: Official website

Laura Bay Conservation Park is a protected area located in the Australian state of South Australia on the west coast of Eyre Peninsula adjoining the headland of Laura Bay Point in the gazetted locality of Laura Bay about 20 kilometres (12 miles) south east of the town of Ceduna.

It was proclaimed on 15 February 1973. The Laura Bay Conservation Reserve which have been dedicated as a conservation reserve under the state’s Crown Lands Act 1929 on 11 November 1993 was added to the conservation park on 10 July 2014.

The following state of significance was published in 1980:

This small park [sic] preserves a diversity of coastal communities ranging from coastal mallee scrub through to mangrove flats. Mangrove areas in South Australia have been markedly depleted. Laura Bay Conservation Park is scenically attractive and accommodates many tourists and visitors.

The conservation park is classified as an IUCN Category III protected area.

== See also ==
- Protected areas of South Australia
- Laura (disambiguation)
