= Laura Bay, South Australia =

Laura Bay
- Suburb
- Coordinates: 32.244°S 133.824°E
- Country: Australia
- State: South Australia
- LGA: District Council of Ceduna
- Location: 533 km (331 mi) NW of Adelaide city centre; 19 km (12 mi) SE of Ceduna
- Established: 1999

Government
  - State electorate: Flinders
  - Federal division: Grey

Population
  - Total: 11 (SAL 2021)
- Time zone: UTC+9:30 (ACST)
  - Summer (DST): UTC+10:30 (ACST)
- Postcode: 5680
- Mean max temp: 23.5 °C (74.3 °F)
- Mean min temp: 10.4 °C (50.7 °F)
- Annual rainfall: 294.6 mm (11.60 in)
Suburbs around Laura Bay
Ceduna	Merghiny	Merghiny
Ceduna; Great Australian Bight	Laura Bay	Mudamuckla
Great Australian Bight	Great Australian Bight	Smoky Bay; Great Australian Bight
- Location; Adjoining localities

Laura Bay is a locality in the Australian state of South Australia located on the west coast of the Eyre Peninsula overlooking the Great Australian Bight about 533 kilometres (331 miles) north-west of the Adelaide city centre and about 19 kilometres (12 miles) south east of the town centre of Ceduna.

The boundaries of the locality were created in 1999 for the “long established name.”

Laura Bay consists of land associated with a section of coastline that includes, from west to east, part of the east coast of Decres Bay, the promontory known as Cape D'Estrees and part of the north coast of Smoky Bay including the inlet known as Laura Bay. The Flinders Highway passes through the locality close to the coastline in a north-west alignment.

The inlet known as Laura Bay was used as a port from at least 1894 to about 1937 mainly for the shipping of grain by farmers in the immediate hinterland. A jetty was in use from 1911 until its demolition in 1937. A school operated from 1927 to 1937.

As of 2012, land use within the locality consists of land zoned for both agricultural and conservation purposes including the Laura Bay Conservation Park.

The 2016 Australian census which was conducted in August 2016 reports that Laura Bay had a population of 14 people.

Laura Bay is located within the federal Division of Grey, the state electoral district of Flinders and the local government area of the District Council of Ceduna.

== See also ==
- Laura (disambiguation)
