= Eucalyptus spreta =

Scientific classification
- Kingdom: Plantae
- Clade: Tracheophytes
- Clade: Angiosperms
- Clade: Eudicots
- Clade: Rosids
- Order: Myrtales
- Family: Myrtaceae
- Genus: Eucalyptus
- Species: E. spreta

Binomial name
- Eucalyptus spreta L.A.S.Johnson & K.D.Hill

Species of eucalyptus

Eucalyptus spreta is a species of mallet or marlock that is endemic to the south coast of Western Australia. It has smooth bark, narrow lance-shaped to curved adult leaves, flower buds in groups of seven, white flowers and cup-shaped fruit.

== Description ==
Eucalyptus spreta is a mallet or marlock that typically grows to a height of 4–10 m (13–33 ft) and does not form a lignotuber. Young plants have dull greyish green, egg-shaped to lance-shaped leaves that are 60–90 mm (2.4–3.5 in) long and 13–20 mm (0.51–0.79 in) wide and petiolate. Adult leaves are the same shade of glossy green on both sides, narrow lance-shaped to curved, 70–130 mm (2.8–5.1 in) long and 7–20 mm (0.28–0.79 in) wide tapering to a petiole 12–20 mm (0.47–0.79 in) long. The flower buds are arranged in leaf axils in groups of seven on an unbranched peduncle 5–13 mm (0.20–0.51 in) long, the individual buds on pedicels 1–5 mm (0.039–0.197 in) long. Mature buds are oval to cylindrical, 7–11 mm (0.28–0.43 in) long and 4–5 mm (0.16–0.20 in) wide with a conical to beaked operculum about the same length as the floral cup. Flowering has been recorded in March and the flowers are white. The fruit is a woody, cup-shaped capsule 4–7 mm (0.16–0.28 in) long and wide with the valves enclosed below rim level.

== Taxonomy and naming ==
Eucalyptus spreta was first formally described in 2001 by Lawrie Johnson and Ken Hill in the journal Telopea from specimens collected 60 km (37 mi) east of Norseman in 1983. The specific epithet (spreta) is from the Latin word spretus, (the past participle of spreno) meaning "separated" or "removed", referring to the isolated distribution of this species from the similar E. pileata.

== Distribution and habitat ==
This mallet grows in woodland in flat areas with calcareous loam or red sand soil types. It is found to the south and east of Norseman to near Balladonia in the Coolgardie, Mallee and Nullarbor biogeographic regions.

== Conservation status ==
This eucalypt is classified as "not threatened" by the Western Australian Government Department of Parks and Wildlife.

== See also ==
- List of Eucalyptus species
