= Wanilla Land Settlement Conservation Park =

Protected area in South Australia

- IUCN category III (natural monument or feature)
- Location within South Australia
- Location: South Australia
- Nearest city: Wanilla
- Coordinates: 34°31′53″S 135°40′33″E
- Area: 17 ha (42 acres)
- Established: 14 November 1985
- Governing body: Department for Environment and Water

Wanilla Land Settlement Conservation Park is a protected area located in the Australian state of South Australia on the Eyre Peninsula in the gazetted locality of Wanilla on the southern side of the Wanilla town centre.

Land in section 121 in the cadastral unit of the Hundred of Wanilla first received protected area status on 14 November 1985 as a conservation reserve proclaimed under the Crown Lands Act 1929 to “protect regionally threatened Sugar Gum woodlands” as well as “numerous plant species of conservation significance, as well as species that are endemic to the region”. The conservation reserve was resumed and proclaimed as the Wanilla Land Settlement Conservation Park on 7 December 2006 “without access under State mining legislation”.

In 2007, the conservation park was described by its managing authority as follows:

Wanilla Land Settlement Conservation Park was proclaimed on 7 December 2006 under the National Parks and Wildlife Act 1972, to protect and conserve endemic, remnant vegetation and a site of heritage significance. The park was proclaimed without access under State mining legislation. Wanilla Land Settlement Conservation Park contains four major vegetation communities, one of which (Eucalyptus peninsularis, E. leptophylla and E. pileata open mallee) is listed as threatened in South Australia. The park also protects numerous plant species of conservation significance and provides suitable habitat for the nationally vulnerable Granite Mudwort (Limosella granitica).

The conservation park is classified as an IUCN Category III protected area.

== See also ==
- Protected areas of South Australia
