= Wharminda Conservation Park =

Protected area in South Australia

- IUCN category III (natural monument or feature)
- Location within South Australia
- Location: South Australia
- Nearest city: Wharminda.
- Coordinates: 33°55′51″S 136°12′37″E
- Area: 2.68 km^{2} (1.03 sq mi)
- Established: 7 November 1985
- Governing body: Department for Environment and Water

Wharminda Conservation Park is a protected area in the Australian state of South Australia located on the Eyre Peninsula in the gazetted locality of Wharminda about 95 kilometres (59 mi) north of Port Lincoln and about 30 kilometres (19 mi) south of Lock.

It was constituted as a conservation park under the National Parks and Wildlife Act 1972 on 7 November 1985 on land all in Section 94 of the cadastral unit of the Hundred of Verran. It was dedicated to “conserve remnant vegetation” which is “dominated by mallee and shrubland” and has “no provision for access under state mining legislation”. Its name is derived from nearby features such as the Wharminda Railway Siding.

As of 2007, the Wharminda Conservation Park partially contains a shrubland including the following plant associations and species of conservation concern. A “mallee community” dominated by Eucalyptus peninsularis which was considered to be “a state endangered ecosystem” was present in the conservation park. Two sub-populations of bearded emubush (Eremophila barbata) were located within the conservation park and which was reported as being “state and regionally rare”. The four following species which were considered as being “rare at a state level” have been recorded in the conservation park - six-nerve spine-bush (Acacia hexaneura), the mallee bitter-pea, the blue range emubush and the hidden leek-orchid (Prasophyllum occultans).

As of 2007, there was no access for visitors into the interior of the conservation park and nor was there plans to create such access.

The conservation park is classified as an IUCN Category III protected area.

== See also ==
- Protected areas of South Australia
