= Sheoak Hill Conservation Park =

Protected area in South Australia

- IUCN category Ia (strict nature reserve)
- Location within South Australia
- Location: South Australia
- Nearest city: Cowell
- Coordinates: 33°22′23″S 136°49′11″E
- Area: 24.27 km^{2} (9.37 sq mi)
- Established: 30 November 1978
- Governing body: Department for Environment and Water

Sheoak Hill Conservation Park is a protected area in the Australian state of South Australia located on the Eyre Peninsula in the gazetted locality of Miltalie about 35 kilometres (22 mi) north-west of Cowell.

The conservation park consists of two areas of land in the cadastral unit of the Hundred of James, which are separated by a road connecting the town centres of Cowell in the south-east and Kimba in the north-west. The land on the south-western side of the road which consists of sections 49, 50 and 51, was constituted as a conservation park on 30 November 1978. The land on the north-eastern side of the road which is described in cadastral terms as “allotment 100 of Deposited Plan No. 38006” was dedicated as a conservation reserve known as the Sheoak Hill Conservation Reserve in 11 November 1993. On 6 September 2012, the land within the conservation reserve was added to the conservation park. As of 2014, access permitted under the state’s Mining Act 1971 only applied to the land formerly in the conservation reserve.

As of 2014, it and three adjacent conservation parks were described by their managing authority as follows:

These parks (sic) are dominated by relatively undisturbed mallee forest, and woodland associations with a Melaleuca shrub understorey. They provide important habitat for Malleefowl populations and contain significant species including Gilbert’s Whistler, Bentham’s Goodenia and the Six-nerve Spine-bush which are listed as rare under the National Parks and Wildlife Act.

The conservation park is classified as an IUCN Category IA protected area.

== See also ==
- Protected areas of South Australia
