= Big Heath Conservation Park =

Protected area in South Australia

- IUCN category Ia (strict nature reserve)
- Location within South Australia
- Location: South Australia
- Nearest city: Naracoorte
- Coordinates: 37°06′02″S 140°33′19″E
- Area: 24.72 km^{2} (9.54 sq mi)
- Established: 7 May 1964
- Visitors: 'low' (in 1994)
- Governing body: Department for Environment and Water

Big Heath Conservation Park (formerly the Big Heath National Park) is a protected area in the Australian state of South Australia located in the gazetted locality of Spence about 20 kilometres (12 mi) south-west of Naracoorte in the state's Limestone Coast region.

The conservation park is located on land in sections 17 to 20, 169 and 179, and Allotment 500 in the cadastral unit of the Hundred of Spence. A drain known as "Drain M", which is part of the drainage infrastructure built in the south east of the state since European settlement, passes through the south-east corner of the conservation park, carrying water from Bool Lagoon in the east to the sea at Beachport in the south.

Protected area status began for the land in sections 17 to 20 and 169 on 7 May 1964 when it was constituted under the Crown Lands Act 1929 as a wild life reserve. On 9 November 1967, it was constituted as the Big Heath National Park under the National Parks Act 1966. In 1972, it was constituted as a conservation park upon the proclamation of the National Parks and Wildlife Act 1972 on 27 April 1972. In 1993, section 179 of the Hundred of Spence was added to the conservation park. In 2010, a parcel of land known as Allotment 500 and which was dedicated as a conservation reserve known as the Big Heath Conservation Reserve under the Crown Lands Act 1929 on 9 December 1993 was added to the conservation park. As of July 2016, the conservation park covered an area of 24.72 square kilometres (9.54 sq mi).

As of 1994, the conservation park was reported as supporting a "diversity of vegetation types which correlate with the topography and soils of the area" as follows:

1. The north-eastern corner has some higher land with "terra rossa soils" which "support a eucalypt woodland with a sparse understorey".
2. The north western end has a soil of "deep sands" which supports a "low woodland" of brown stringybark and pink gum with the "dominant understorey species" being desert banksia.
3. Limestone outcrops located throughout the conservation park's extent support woodlands of manna gum, South Australian blue gum and pink gum.
4. "Deep depressions" in the ground level typically lack "tree or scrub cover" and are surrounded by sedges. However, depressed areas in the south-eastern corner of the conservation park support several different plant associations. Firstly, the deeper depressions are surrounded by river red gums of "varying age and densities". Secondly, shallower depressions are surrounded by a "dense heath" of mallee honeymyrtle, yellow hakea and prickly tea-tree and which support the following species as the ground elevation increases - broombush, grass tree and dwarf sheoak.
5. Almost 20% of plant species recorded within the conservation park were introduced species with boneseed, a "scheduled pest plant" being the one of most concern.

As of 1994, visitor use was reported as being "low" and was mainly concerned with "nature study by the local and Naracoorte communities".

The conservation park is classified as an IUCN Category Ia protected area.
