= Conservation reserves of South Australia =

Class of protected area

Conservation reserves of South Australia is a class of protected area used in the Australian state of South Australia where crown land under the control of the responsible minister has been dedicated for conservation purposes. This class of protected area has been in use as early as 1985. In 2016 there were 15 conservation reserves that covered an area of 194.7 square kilometres (75.1 sq mi). As of March 2022 the number had increased to 16 conservation reserves covering 193.6 square kilometres (74.73 sq mi) or less than 1% of South Australia's land area.

== Description ==
In South Australia, a conservation reserve is a class of protected area concerned with "(crown) land set aside for conservation of natural and cultural features under the Crown Land Management Act 2009" and its predecessor, the Crown Lands Act 1929. This class of protected area has been in use since at least 1985.

Conservation reserves only concerns land under the control of the responsible government minister and which has been dedicated for conservation purposes.

Declaration of a parcel of crown land as a conservation reserve can be an interim step towards declaration as a reserve under the National Parks and Wildlife Act 1972.

As of 2016, conservation reserves are managed by the Department of Environment, Water and Natural Resources.

As of June 2016, reserves declared under the Crown Land Management Act 2009 totalled fifteen with a total area of 194.71 km^{2} (75.18 sq mi) or less than 0.1% of South Australia's area. As of 2014, all fifteen declared conservation reserves have been classified as IUCN Category VI protected areas.

== Conservation reserves declared as of June 2016 ==
As of December 2016, the following conservation reserves were listed by the Government of South Australia.

=== Bernouilli Conservation Reserve ===
Bernouilli Conservation Reserve (36°58′21″S 139°41′09″E) was established on 11 November 1993. It is located on 265 hectares (650 acres) of land in the locality of Cape Jaffa in the state's Limestone Coast.

=== Buckleboo Conservation Reserve ===
Buckleboo Conservation Reserve (32°54′53″S 136°12′52″E) was established on 13 September 1990. It is located on 281 hectares (690 acres) of land in the locality of Buckleboo in the Eyre Peninsula. Its name is derived from the "former town of Buckleboo".

=== Bunbury Conservation Reserve ===
Bunbury Conservation Reserve (36°08′32″S 139°57′33″E) was established on 11 September 1993. It is located on 1,945 hectares (4,810 acres) of land in the locality of Bunbury in the state's Murray and Mallee region.

=== Bunkers Conservation Reserve ===
Bunkers Conservation Reserve (31°23′55″S 138°50′14″E) was established on 27 March 2001. It is located on 14,062 hectares (34,750 acres) of land in the locality of Flinders Ranges in the mountain range of the same name in the state's Far North region. Its name is derived from the Bunker Range. The crown land was placed under "the care, control and management of the Yellow Footed Rock Wallaby Association Incorporated, subject to the various conditions as stipulated in the Memorandum of Agreement signed on 28 December 2000, between the Minister for Environment and Heritage and the Yellow Footed Rock Wallaby Association Incorporated".

=== Cortlinye Conservation Reserve ===
Cortlinye Conservation Reserve (33°03′16″S 136°19′26″E) was established on 12 November 1987. It is located on 208 hectares (510 acres) of land in the locality of Cortlinye on the Eyre Peninsula. Its name is derived from the land's previous tenure as the Cortlinye Water Conservation Reserve.

=== Cox Scrub Conservation Reserve ===
Cox Scrub Conservation Reserve (35°21′18″S 138°44′15″E) was established on 11 November 1993. It is located on 21 hectares (52 acres) of land in the locality of Tooperang. Its name is derived from its proximity to the Cox Scrub Conservation Park.

=== Cunyarie Conservation Reserve ===
Cunyarie Conservation Reserve (32°56′48″S 136°16′15″E) was established on 11 November 1985. It is located on 94 hectares (230 acres) of land in the locality of Cunyarie on the Eyre Peninsula.

=== Desert Camp Conservation Reserve ===
Desert Camp Conservation Reserve (36°28′30″S 140°22′55″E) was established on 11 November 1993. It is located on 882 hectares (2,180 acres) of land in the locality of Marcollat on the state's Limestone Coast about 65 kilometres (40 mi) north west of Naracoorte. Its name is derived from its proximity to the Desert Camp Conservation Park.

=== Hardings Springs Conservation Reserve ===
Hardings Springs Conservation Reserve (36°03′54″S 140°43′55″E) was established on 24 April 1997. It is located on 7 hectares (17 acres) of land in the locality of Sherwood on the state's Limestone Coast.

=== Lacroma Conservation Reserve ===
Lacroma Conservation Reserve (33°16′10″S 136°16′50″E) was established on 14 April 1988. It is located on 45 hectares (110 acres) of land in the locality of Solomon on the Eyre Peninsula. Its name is derived from the Lacroma Water Conservation Reserve which was located on some "adjacent" land.

=== Moongi Conservation Reserve ===
Moongi Conservation Reserve (32°53′22″S 136°09′05″E) was established on 13 September 1990. It is located on 232 hectares (570 acres) of land in the locality of Buckleboo on the Eyre Peninsula. Its name is derived from its proximity to "the former town of Moongi".

=== Mootra Conservation Reserve ===
Mootra Conservation Reserve (33°02′52″S 136°25′43″E) was established on 2 March 1989. It is located on 949 hectares (2,350 acres) of land in the localities of Moseley and Cortlinye on the Eyre Peninsula. Its name is derived from the previous use of the land as the Mootra Water Conservation Reserve.

=== Pinkawillinie Reservoir Conservation Reserve ===
Pinkawillinie Reservoir Conservation Reserve (32°57′33″S 136°07′49″E) was established on 14 May 1987. It is located on 279 hectares (690 acres) of land in the locality of Pinkawillinie. Its name is derived from the previous use of the land as the Pinkawillinie Water Conservation Reserve. An earlier proposal to use ‘Pinkawillinie’ as the name of the conservation reserve was not accepted by Geographical Names Board due to "possible confusion with the Pinkawillinie Conservation Park proclaimed under the National Parks & Wildlife Act". The name was subsequently approved by the board in 1988.

=== Poolgarra Conservation Reserve ===
Poolgarra Conservation Reserve (33°17′52″S 136°05′10″E) was established on 28 January 1988. It is located on 170 hectares (420 acres) of land in the locality of Caralue on the Eyre Peninsula. Its name is derived from the previous use of the land as the Poolgara Water Conservation Reserve.

=== Tola Conservation Reserve ===
Tola Conservation Reserve (33°07′38″S 136°18′54″E) was established on 28 January 1988. It is located on 30 hectares (74 acres) of land in the locality of Solomon on the Eyre Peninsula. Its name is derived from the Tola Tank Water Conservation Reserve because its land holding consists of part of the land used for the water conservation reserve.

== Former conservation reserves ==
The following is a list of former conservation reserves dedicated under the former Crown Lands Act 1929 and which either have been added to existing protected areas or proclaimed as new protected areas constituted under the National Parks and Wildlife Act 1972.

| Reserve | Dedicated | Ceased | Fate |
|---|---|---|---|
| Barwell | 11 November 1993 | 22 March 2007 | Added to Barwell Conservation Park |
| Bascombe Well | 11 November 1993 | 22 March 2007 | Added to Bascombe Well Conservation Park |
| Big Heath | 9 December 1993 | 16 September 2010 | Added to Big Heath Conservation Park |
| Caralue Bluff | 9 December 1993 | 6 September 2012 | Proclaimed Caralue Bluff Conservation Park |
| Cocata | 11 November 1993 | 20 August 2009 | Proclaimed Cocata Conservation Park |
| Coffin Bay | 11 November 1993 | 20 August 2009 | Abolished on 21 May 1998 and added to the Coffin Bay National Park on 17 June 1999. |
| Ediacara | 11 November 1993 | Unknown | Proclaimed Ediacara Conservation Park |
| Gawler Ranges | 11 November 1993 | 6 September 2012 | Proclaimed Gawler Ranges Conservation Park |
| Heggaton | 11 November 1993 | 6 September 2012 | Proclaimed Heggaton Conservation Park |
| Hincks | 11 November 1993 | 30 September 2004 | Added to Hincks Conservation Park |
| Kulliparu | 11 November 1993 | 20 August 2009 | Proclaimed Kulliparu Conservation Park |
| Lake Gilles | 9 December 1994 | 5 August 2010 | Added to Lake Gilles Conservation Park |
| Laura Bay | 11 November 1993 | 10 July 2014 | Added to Laura Bay Conservation Park |
| Lincoln | 11 November 1993 | 7 December 2006 | Proclaimed Lincoln Conservation Park |
| Malgra | 20 October 1988 | 11 November 2010 | Proclaimed Malgra Conservation Park |
| Munyaroo | 11 November 1993 | 20 August 2009 | Added to Munyaroo Conservation Park |
| Murrunatta | 11 November 1993 | 7 December 2006 | Added to Murrunatta Conservation Park |
| Peachna | 11 November 1993 | 22 March 2007 | Proclaimed Peachna Conservation Park |
| Pinkawillinie | 11 November 1993 | 21 November 2002 | Added to Pinkawillinie Conservation Park |
| Point Bell | 11 November 1993 | 29 June 2006 | Added to Point Bell Conservation Park |
| Pureba | 11 November 1993 | 29 June 2006 | Added to Pureba Conservation Park |
| Shannon | 2 September 1993 | 2007 | Proclaimed Shannon Conservation Park |
| Sheoak Hill | 11 November 1993 | 6 September 2012 | Added to Sheoak Hill Conservation Park |
| Simpson | 29 September 1986 | 5 August 2010 | Proclaimed Simpson Conservation Park |
| The Plug Range | 11 November 1993 | 6 September 2012 | Proclaimed The Plug Range Conservation Park |
| Wahgunyah | 11 November 1993 | 21 April 2011 | Proclaimed Wahgunyah Conservation Park |
| Wanilla Land Settlement | 14 November 1985 | 7 December 2006 | Proclaimed Wanilla Land Settlement Conservation Park |
| Woakwine | 11 November 1993 | 16 September 2010 | Proclaimed Woakwine Conservation Park |
| Yumbarra | 11 November 1993 | 29 June 2006 | The land in the Hundred of O'Loughlin was added to the Yumbarra Conservation Park, and the land described as “section 79, Out of Hundreds (Fowler)” was proclaimed the Boondina Conservation Park |

== Other conservation reserves ==
Other places in South Australia whose names include the words "conservation reserve" include:

- Mutton Cove Conservation Reserve is located on land adjoining the Port River and including a bay named Mutton Cove in the suburb of Osborne in the Adelaide metropolitan area. Its existence is mentioned in various documents published by official sources in South Australia. However, as of April 2017, the conservation reserve has not been gazetted, although the bay known as Mutton Cove is located within the boundaries of the protected area known as the Adelaide Dolphin Sanctuary. There is a ship's graveyard site at Mutton Cove, there being the wreck of a former steel steamship, later used as a coal hulk, at the northern end of the cove, near Pelican Point. After the seawall at the reserve was breached by a huge storm in 2016, the area is now regularly flooded by the river, and is also threatened by rising sea levels. This will cause the samphires to die off and the mangroves to increase.
- Nurragi Conservation Reserve, a private protected area located in the localities of Milang, Nurragi and Sandergrove and owned by the National Trust of South Australia.
- Tennyson Dunes Conservation Reserve is located on land in the suburb of Tennyson in the Adelaide metropolitan area and which was reported as being dedicated as a conservation reserve by Ian Hunter, the Minister for Sustainability, Environment and Conservation, on 13 September 2015. However, as of December 2016, the conservation reserve has not been gazetted.

== See also ==
- Protected areas of South Australia
