= The Plug Range Conservation Park =

Protected area in South Australia

- IUCN category VI (protected area with sustainable use of natural resources)
- Location within South Australia
- Location: South Australia
- Nearest city: Cowell
- Coordinates: 33°29′24″S 136°43′07″E
- Area: 25.82 km^{2} (9.97 sq mi)
- Established: 11 November 1993
- Governing body: Department for Environment and Water

The Plug Range Conservation Park is a protected area in the Australian state of South Australia located on the Eyre Peninsula in the gazetted locality of Miltalie about 28 kilometres (17 mi) north-west of Cowell.

The conservation park was proclaimed on 6 September 2012 under the state’s National Parks and Wildlife Act 1972 in respect to land previously dedicated as a conservation reserve known as The Plug Range Conservation Reserve on 11 November 1993. The conservation park was constituted to permit access under the state’s Mining Act 1971 and Petroleum and Geothermal Energy Act 2000. Its name is ultimately derived from a nearby range of hills known as The Plug Range.

As of 2014, it and three adjacent conservation parks were described by their managing authority as follows:

These parks (sic) are dominated by relatively undisturbed mallee forest, and woodland associations with a Melaleuca shrub understorey. They provide important habitat for Malleefowl populations and contain significant species including Gilbert’s Whistler, Bentham’s Goodenia and the Six-nerve Spine-bush which are listed as rare under the National Parks and Wildlife Act.

The conservation park is classified as an IUCN Category VI protected area.

== See also ==
- Protected areas of South Australia
