= Shannon Conservation Park =

Protected area in South Australia

- IUCN category VI (protected area with sustainable use of natural resources)
- Location within South Australia
- Location: South Australia
- Nearest city: Karkoo
- Coordinates: 33°57′32″S 135°37′12″E
- Area: 5.44 km^{2} (2.10 sq mi)
- Established: 2 September 1993
- Governing body: Department for Environment and Water

Shannon Conservation Park (formerly the Shannon Conservation Reserve) is a protected area in the Australian state of South Australia located on the Eyre Peninsula in the gazetted locality of Karkoo about 95 kilometres (59 mi) north of Port Lincoln and about 45 kilometres (28 mi) south of Lock.

It was proclaimed under the National Parks and Wildlife Act 1972 in 2007 on land all in Section 100 of the cadastral unit of the Hundred of Shannon which was previously dedicated as a conservation reserve on 2 September 1993 under the Crown Lands Act 1929.

As of 2007, the Shannon Conservation Park was reported as being “dominated by mallee” and included a river red gum woodland which was considered to be “a regionally threatened community”.

As of 2007, there was no access for visitors into the interior of the conservation park and nor was there any plans to create such access.

The conservation park is classified as an IUCN Category VI protected area.

== See also ==
- Protected areas of South Australia
