= Muellerolaria =

Scientific classification
- Kingdom: Plantae
- Clade: Tracheophytes
- Clade: Angiosperms
- Clade: Eudicots
- Clade: Asterids
- Order: Asterales
- Family: Asteraceae
- Subfamily: Asteroideae
- Tribe: Astereae
- Subtribe: Brachyscominae
- Genus: Muellerolaria; G.L.Nesom

Species
- Muellerolaria picridifolia (F.Muell.) G.L.Nesom; Muellerolaria rudis (Benth.) G.L.Nesom

Genus of flowering plants

Muellerolaria is a genus of flowering plants in the family Asteraceae. It includes two species native to southern Australia.

- Muellerolaria picridifolia (F.Muell.) G.L.Nesom
- Muellerolaria rudis (Benth.) G.L.Nesom
