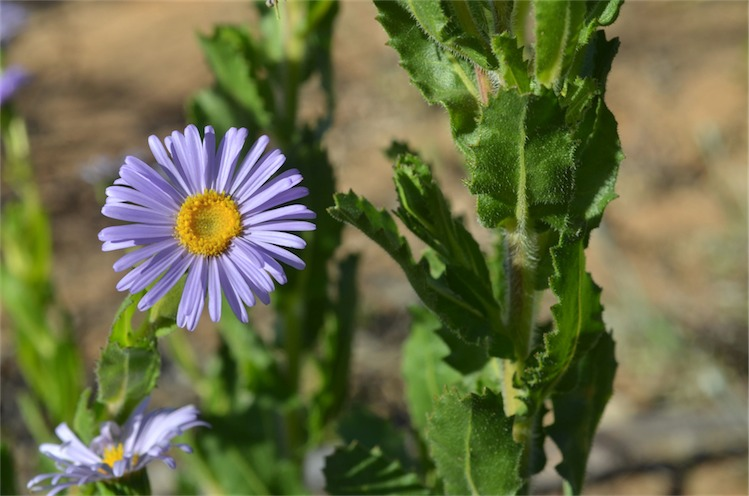

Scientific classification
- Kingdom: Plantae
- Clade: Tracheophytes
- Clade: Angiosperms
- Clade: Eudicots
- Clade: Asterids
- Order: Asterales
- Family: Asteraceae
- Genus: Muellerolaria
- Species: M. rudis

Binomial name
- Muellerolaria rudis (Benth.) G.L.Nesom

Synonyms
- List: Aster exsul Lindl.; Aster exul Lindl.; Eurybia rudis Benth.; Eurybia rudis var. arguta Benth.; Eurybia scabra Benth.; Olearia rudis F.Muell. ex Benth.; Olearia rudis var. glabriuscula Benth.; Olearia rudis var. scabra (Benth.) Benth.; Shawia rudis (Benth.) Sch.Bip.; Shawia scabra (Benth.) Sch.Bip.

= Muellerolaria rudis =

Species of plant

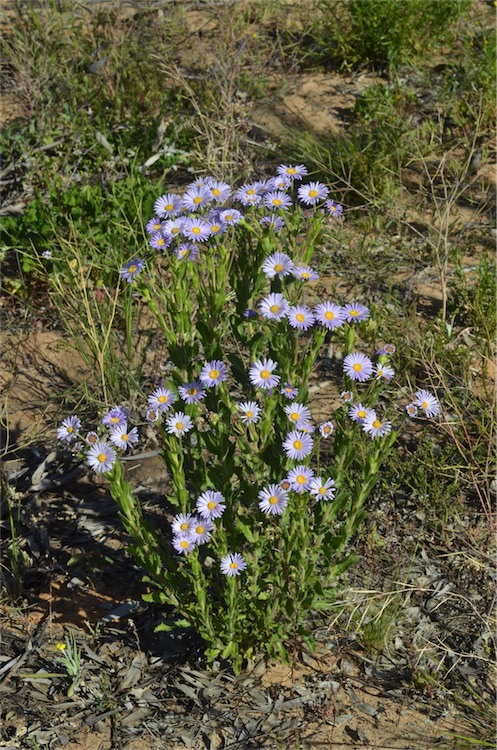
Habit in Wyperfield National Park

Muellerolaria rudis, commonly known as azure daisy-bush, is a species of flowering plant in the family Asteraceae and is endemic to eastern Australia. It is a usually short-lived shrub with crowded elliptic or egg-shaped leaves, and pale blue, mauve or purple and orange, daisy-like inflorescences.

== Description ==
Muellerolaria rudis is a stiff, usually short-lived shrub or subshrub that typically grows to a height of up to about 1.3 m (4 ft 3 in), its branchlets usually bristly-hairy. It has crowded elliptic or egg-shaped leaves with the narrower end towards the base, 15–45 mm (0.59–1.77 in) long and 7–18 mm (0.28–0.71 in) wide. Both surface of the leaves are bristly-hairy, the edges are often serrated, and the base is slightly stem-clasping. The heads or daisy-like "flowers" are arranged singly or in corymbs on the ends of branches or in leaf axils on a peduncle 20–50 mm (0.79–1.97 in) and are 25–50 mm (0.98–1.97 in) in diameter. Each head has 40 to 75 pale blue, mauve or purple ray florets, the ligule 10–20 mm (0.39–0.79 in) long, surrounding 60 to 250 orange disc florets. Flowering occurs from July to October and the fruit is a glabrous achene, the pappus 5–7 mm (0.20–0.28 in) long.

== Taxonomy ==
This daisy was first formally described in 1837 by George Bentham who gave it the name Eurybia rudis in Enumeratio plantarum quas in Novae Hollandiae ora austro-occidentali ad fluvium Cygnorum et in sinu Regis Georgii collegit Carolus Liber Baro de Hügel from specimens collected near the Swan River. The specific epithet (rudis) means "rough" or "wild". In 1867, Bentham changed the name to Olearia rudis in Flora Australiensis. In 2020 Guy L. Nesom placed the species in the newly-described genus Muellerolaria as M. rudis after Olearia had been found to be polyphyletic.

== Distribution and habitat ==
Muellerolaria rudis grows in mallee and woodland in western New South Wales, north-western Victoria, the south-east of South Australia, and southern Western Australia.
