= Wittelbee Conservation Park =

Protected area in South Australia

- IUCN category III (natural monument or feature)
- Location within South Australia
- Location: South Australia, Ceduna
- Nearest city: Ceduna
- Coordinates: 37°10′22″S 139°51′49″E
- Area: 1.7 km^{2} (0.66 sq mi)
- Established: 16 January 1969
- Governing body: Department for Environment and Water
- Website: Official website

Wittelbee Conservation Park, formerly the Wittelbee National Park, is a protected area in the Australian state of South Australia located on the west coast of Eyre Peninsula in adjoining the headland of Wittelbee Point about 10 kilometres (6.2 miles) south east of the town of Ceduna.

The conservation park consists of the following land in the cadastral unit of the Hundred of Bonython - section 101 and a parcel of land identified as Allotment 1 of Deposited Plan No. 31612. The land in section 101 first acquired protected area status as a national park declared on 16 January 1969 under the National Parks Act 1966. On 27 April 1972, the national park was reconstituted as the Wittelbee Conservation Park under the National Parks and Wildlife Act 1972. On 19 December 1991, additional land, i.e. Allotment 1 of Deposited Plan No. 31612, was added to the conservation park to extend protection over land located between high tide and low tide. As of 2018, it covered an area of 1.7 square kilometres (0.66 sq mi).

The following statement of significance was published in 1980:

The park is significant as it contains an area of samphire swamp which is not well represented in the National Parks system. Wittelbee Conservation Park contains mallee vegetation right up to the coastal dune, fine sandy beaches and a low rocky headland. A pleasant picnicking area is utilised by the local residents and tourists.

The conservation park is categorised as an IUCN Category III protected area. In 1980, it was listed on the now-defunct Register of the National Estate.
