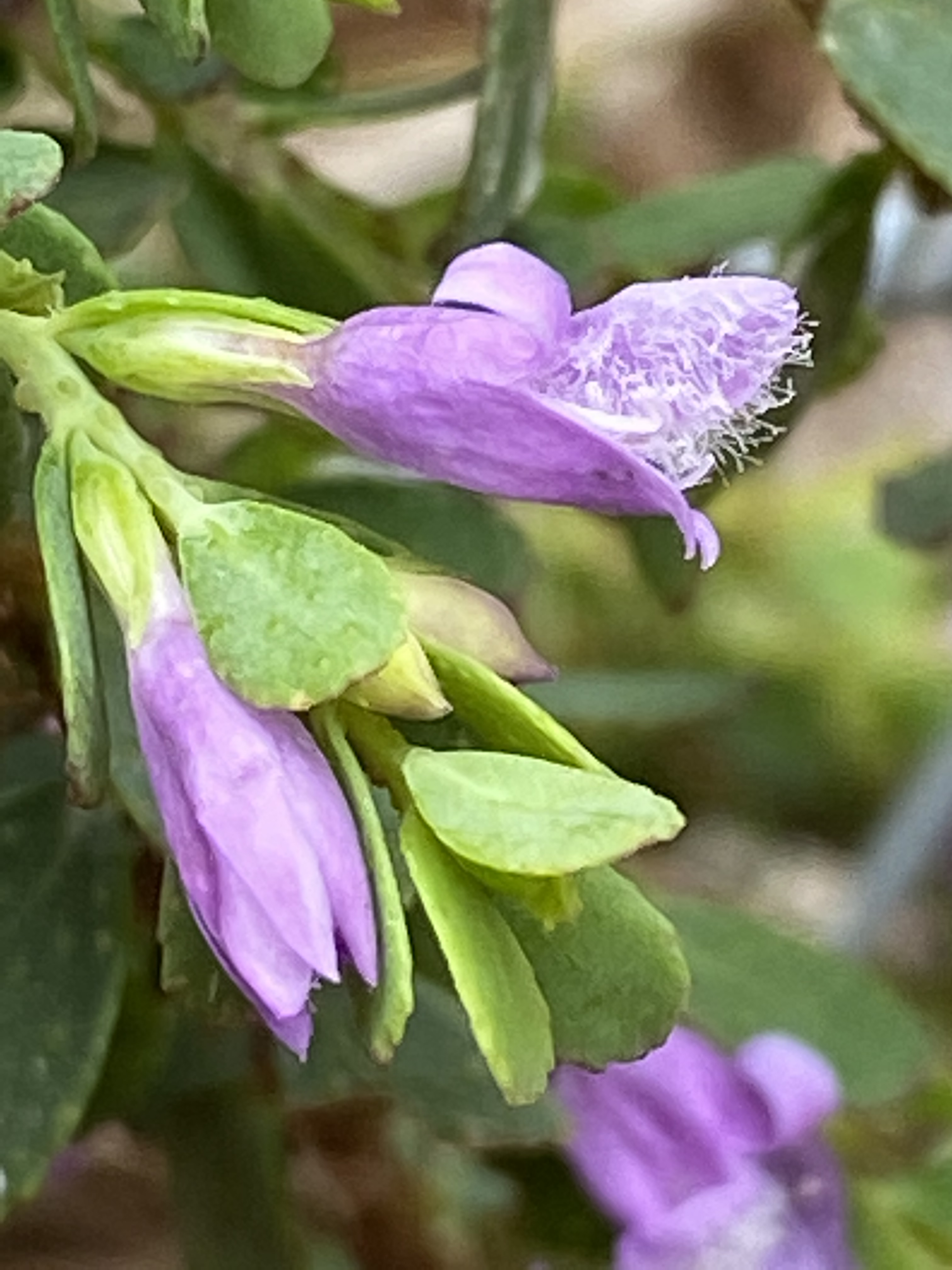

Conservation status
- Endangered (EPBC Act)

Scientific classification
- Kingdom: Plantae
- Clade: Tracheophytes
- Clade: Angiosperms
- Clade: Eudicots
- Clade: Asterids
- Order: Lamiales
- Family: Scrophulariaceae
- Genus: Eremophila
- Species: E. barbata

Binomial name
- Eremophila barbata Chinnock

= Eremophila barbata =

Species of plant

Eremophila barbata is a flowering plant in the figwort family, Scrophulariaceae and is endemic to a small area in the Eyre Peninsula of South Australia. It is a very rare, small, spreading shrub distinguished by a prominent "beard" on the lower lobe of its lilac-coloured flowers.

== Description ==
Eremophila barbata is a spreading shrub, sometimes growing to 1 m (3 ft) high and 3 m (10 ft) wide with lumpy branches due to the presence of wart-like tubercles. The leaves are arranged alternately, 5–10 mm (0.2–0.4 in) long, 3–7.5 mm (0.1–0.3 in) wide, egg-shaped with the narrower end towards the base, clustered towards the ends of the stem and slightly bluish-green in colour.

The flowers are usually borne singly in leaf axils and lack a stalk. There are 5 green, narrow triangular sepals 2–5 mm (0.08–0.2 in) long. The 5 petals are 7–12 mm (0.3–0.5 in) long and joined at their lower end to form a tube. The tube and the petal lobes on its end are lilac-coloured, lack spots and are glabrous on the outside. The lower, middle petal lobe and the inside of the petal tube is covered with long, soft hairs.

== Taxonomy and naming ==
Eremophila barbata was first formally described by Robert Chinnock in 1985 with the description published in The Journal of the Adelaide Botanic Garden. The type specimen was collected by Chinnock in 1979 in the Hincks National Park. The specific epithet (barbata) is a Latin word meaning "bearded."

== Distribution and habitat ==
This eremophila is only known from two small areas on the Eyre Peninsula - Hincks Wilderness Protection Area and near Ungarra where it grows in rocky clay as an understorey in mallee.

== Conservation status ==
Eremophila barbata is classified as "endangered" in the Environment Protection and Biodiversity Conservation Act 1999 and was listed as "rare" in the 1997 IUCN Red List of Threatened Plants.

== Use in horticulture ==
The long, arching branches of this species make it suitable for growing in a rockery or hanging over a wall. It is long-lived in the garden and some specimens have grown for more than 30 years. It can be propagated from cuttings and grown in a wide variety of soils and aspects although it be damaged by frost when young.
