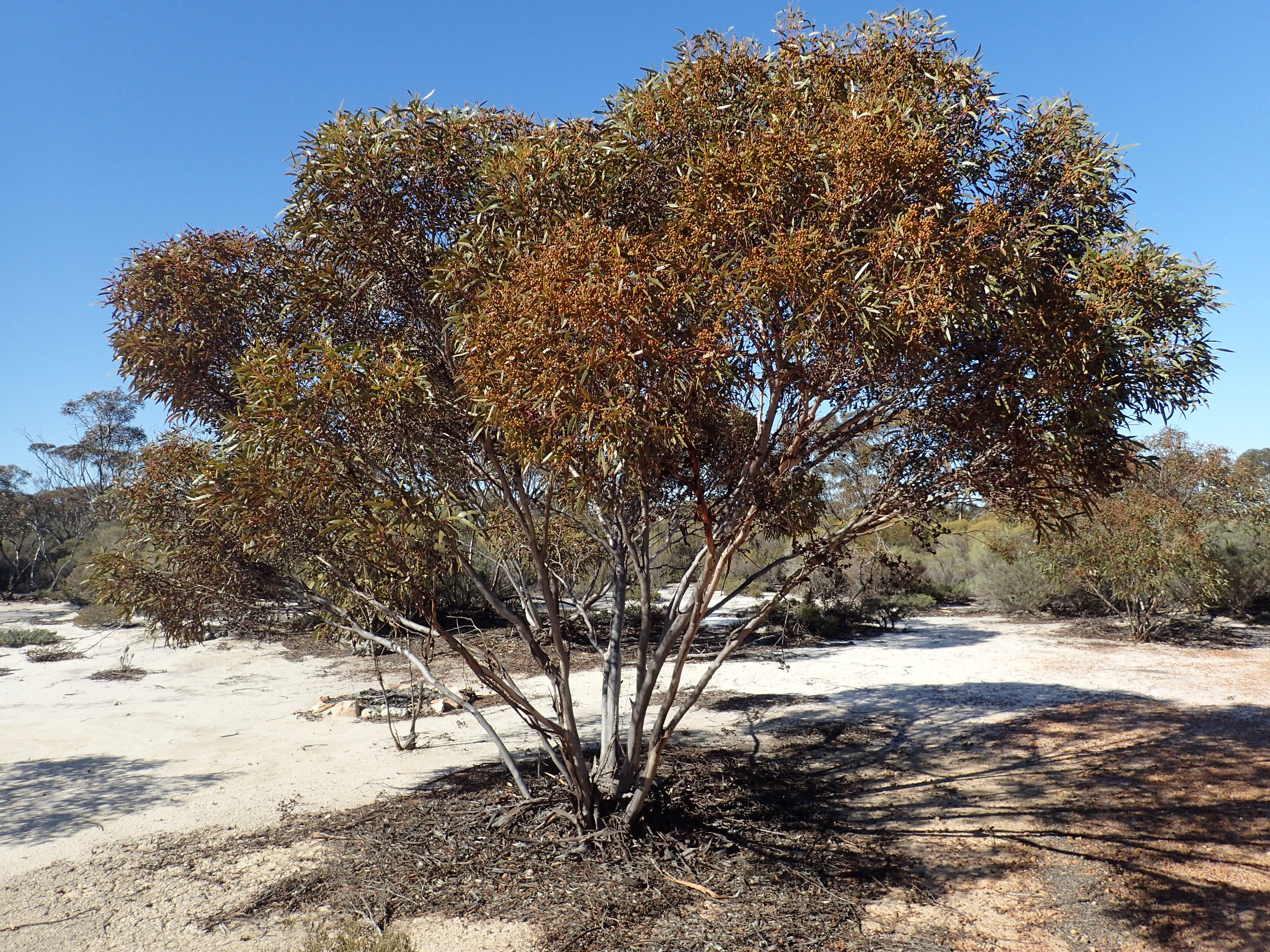
- Eucalyptus pileata growing near Mount Madden dam, south of Lake King

Conservation status
- Vulnerable (IUCN 3.1)

Scientific classification
- Kingdom: Plantae
- Clade: Tracheophytes
- Clade: Angiosperms
- Clade: Eudicots
- Clade: Rosids
- Order: Myrtales
- Family: Myrtaceae
- Genus: Eucalyptus
- Species: E. pileata

Binomial name
- Eucalyptus pileata Blakely

= Eucalyptus pileata =

Capped mallee

Species of eucalyptus

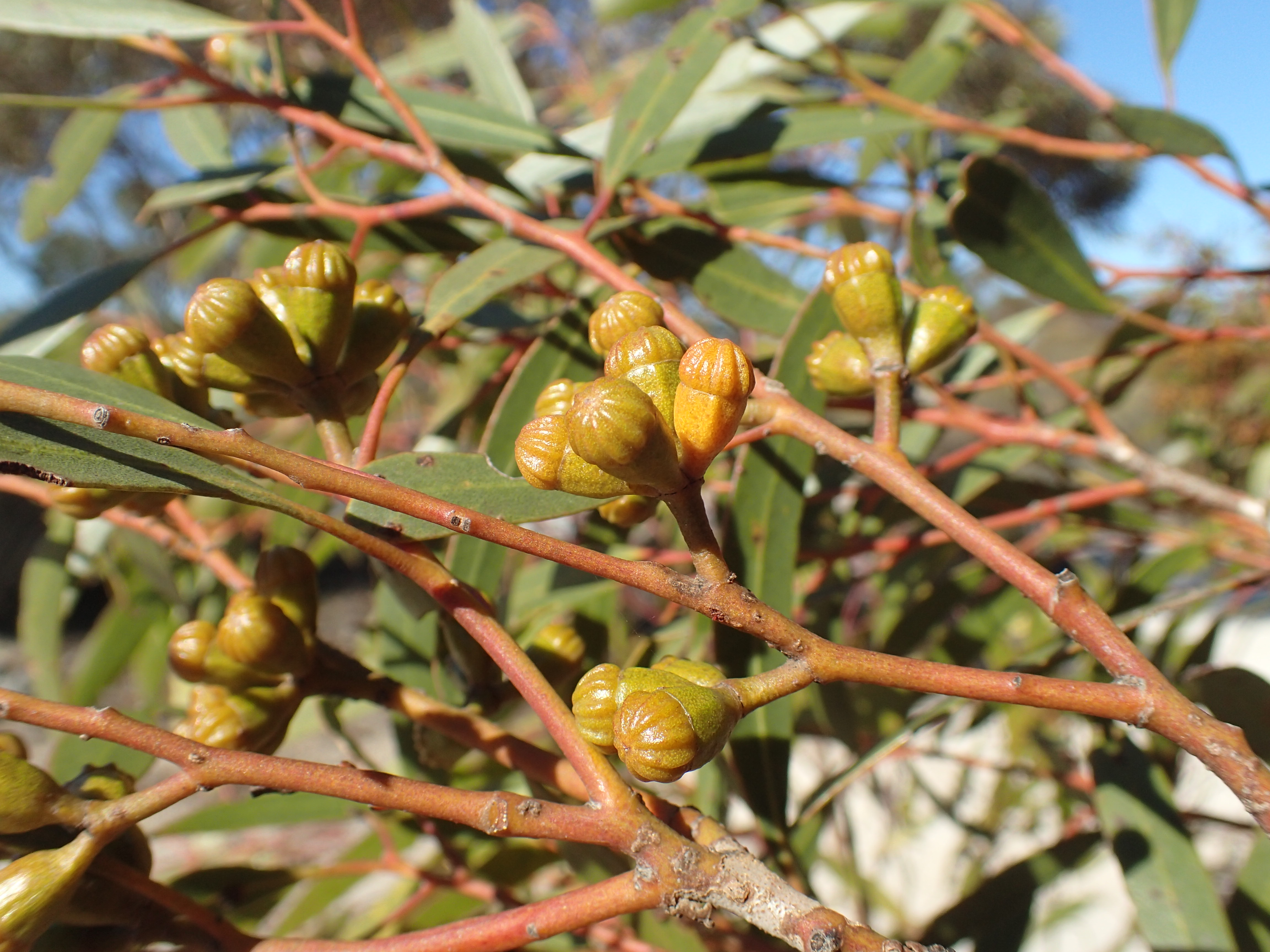
Flower buds

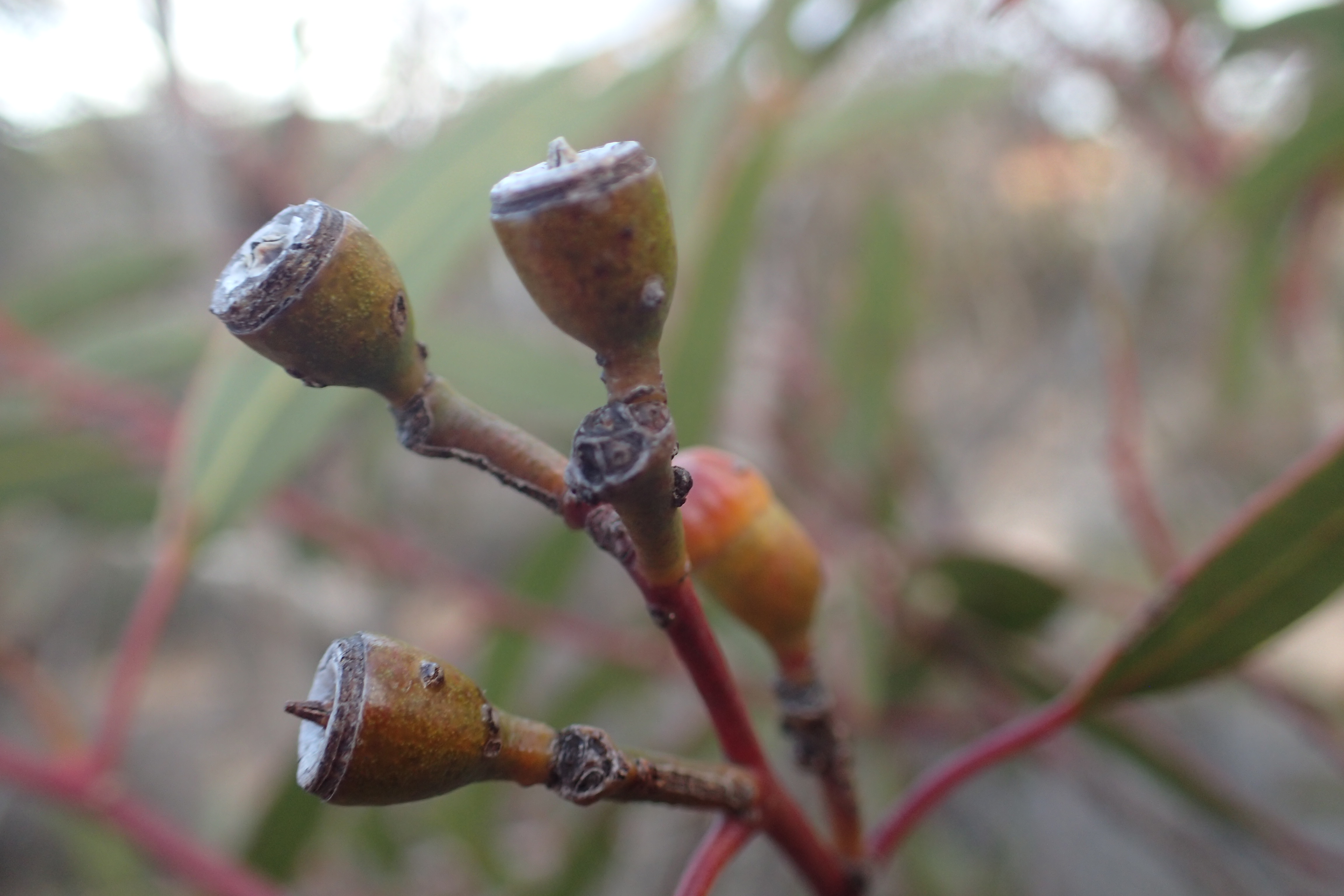
Fruit

Eucalyptus pileata, commonly known as the capped mallee, is a species of mallee that is native to South Australia and Western Australia. It has smooth greyish bark, narrow lance-shaped adult leaves, flower buds in groups of seven, white flowers and cup-shaped, conical or barrel-shaped fruit.

== Description ==
Eucalyptus pileata is a mallee, rarely a small tree, that typically grows to a height of 3.5–8 m (11–26 ft) and forms a lignotuber. It has smooth, greyish bark that is shed in long ribbons to reveal orange or yellow new bark. Young plants and coppice regrowth have egg-shaped, bluish green leaves that are 55–90 mm (2.2–3.5 in) long and 10–20 mm (0.39–0.79 in) wide. Adult leaves are narrow lance-shaped, the same shade of glossy green on both sides, 65–140 mm (2.6–5.5 in) long and 7–25 mm (0.28–0.98 in) wide, tapering to a petiole 10–15 mm (0.39–0.59 in) long. The flower buds are arranged in leaf axils on an unbranched peduncle 5–15 mm (0.20–0.59 in) long, the individual buds on pedicels 1–6 mm (0.039–0.236 in) long. Mature buds are cylindrical to oval or pear-shaped, 7–12 mm (0.28–0.47 in) long and 5–8 mm (0.20–0.31 in) wide with a turban-shaped, ribbed operculum 3–5 mm (0.12–0.20 in) long and 4–8 mm (0.16–0.31 in) wide. Flowering occurs from February to May or from September to October and the flowers are white. The fruit is a woody, cup-shaped, conical or barrel-shaped capsule 6–10 mm (0.24–0.39 in) long and 7–8 mm (0.28–0.31 in) wide.

== Taxonomy and naming ==
Eucalyptus pileata was first formally described in 1934 by William Blakely in his book A Key to Eucalypts from material collected near Ravensthorpe in 1909. The specific epithet (pileata) is from the Latin pileatus meaning "wearing a pileus", a kind of felt cap, referring to the cap-shaped operculum.

== Distribution and habitat ==
Capped mallee grows in Western Australia and South Australia. It grows in shrubland between Balladonia, Kondinin, Norseman, Nugadong and Ravensthorpe in Western Australia. In South Australia it occurs on the Eyre Peninsula, mainly between the Hincks Conservation Park and Cummins.

== Conservation status ==
This eucalypt is classified as "not threatened" in Western Australia by the Western Australian Government Department of Parks and Wildlife.

== See also ==
- List of Eucalyptus species
