= Laura Airport =

- IATA: LUU; ICAO: YLRA

Summary
- Airport type: Public
- Operator: Cook Shire Council
- Serves: Laura, Queensland
- Elevation AMSL: 627 ft / 191 m
- Coordinates: 15°33′39″S 144°27′06″E

Map
- Location in Queensland

Runways
Direction	Length		Surface
Direction	m	ft	Surface
16/34	1,936	6,352	Asphalt
- Sources: Australian AIP and aerodrome chart

Laura Airport (IATA: LUU, ICAO: YLRA) is situated in Laura, Queensland, Australia. The airport is 1.5 nautical miles (2.8 km; 1.7 mi) southeast of the locality.

== See also ==
- Transport in Australia
- List of airports in Queensland
