= Wanilla Conservation Park =

Conservation park in South Australia

- IUCN category III (natural monument or feature)
- Location within South Australia
- Location: South Australia
- Nearest city: Wanilla
- Coordinates: 34°33′S 135°43′E
- Area: 2.80 km^{2} (1.08 sq mi)
- Established: 27 April 1978
- Governing body: Department for Environment and Water

Wanilla Conservation Park is a protected area located in the Australian state of South Australia on the Eyre Peninsula in the gazetted locality of Wanilla about 4 kilometres (2.5 miles) east of the Wanilla town centre.

In 2007, the conservation park was described by its managing authority as follows:

The park was proclaimed on 27 April 1978 under the National Parks and Wildlife Act 1972, to protect significant Sugar Gum woodland habitat. The park was proclaimed without access under State mining legislation. Wanilla Conservation Park is dominated by Sugar Gum woodland with heath understorey. Small patches of the park are vegetated with Broombush (Melaleuca uncinata) shrubland over low shrubs and sedges. The park is characterised by rolling hills and relatively steep gullies. Wanilla Conservation Park is bisected by a road reserve into northern and southern sections.

The conservation park is classified as an IUCN Category III protected area.

== See also ==
- Protected areas of South Australia
