= Laura (magazine) =

German women's magazine

- Categories: Women's magazine
- Frequency: Weekly
- Circulation: 64,240 (Q2 2024)
- First issue: 11 January 1995
- Company: Bauer Media Group
- Country: Germany
- Based in: Hamburg
- Language: German
- Website: www.laura.de

Laura is a German women's weekly magazine.

== History ==
It was first published in January 1995.

Laura provides articles on women's, food, entertainment and is published on a weekly basis.

== Circulation statistics ==
According to IVW, the average paid circulation in the fourth quarter of 2014 was 165,926 copies. This is 156 fewer copies per issue (-0.09 %) than in the same quarter of the previous year. The number of subscribers fell by 457 within a year to an average of 9637 per issue (-4.53 %); this means that around 5.8 % of readers subscribed to the magazine.
