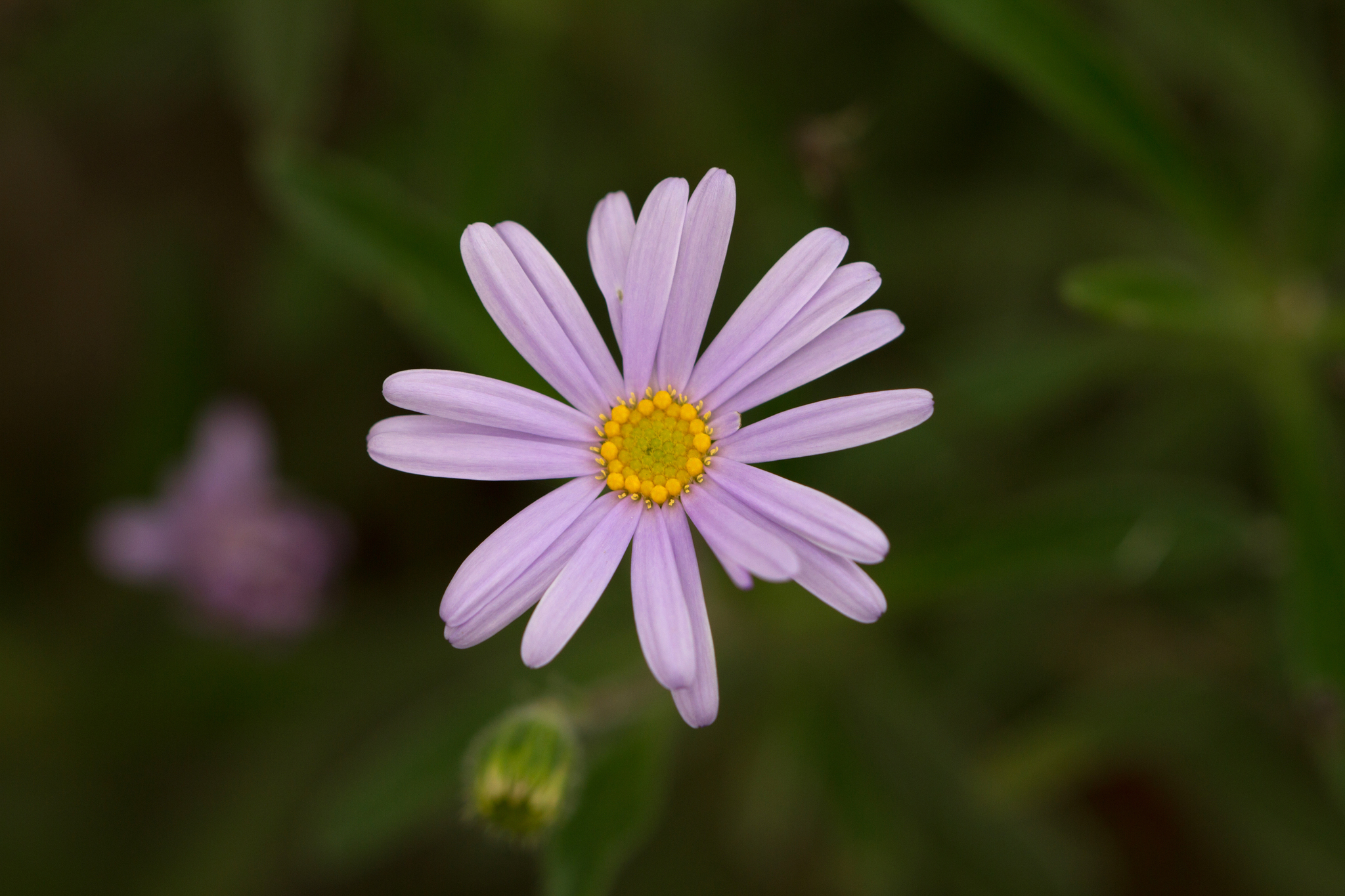

Scientific classification
- Kingdom: Plantae
- Clade: Embryophytes
- Clade: Tracheophytes
- Clade: Angiosperms
- Clade: Eudicots
- Clade: Asterids
- Order: Asterales
- Family: Asteraceae
- Genus: Muellerolaria
- Species: M. picridifolia

Binomial name
- Muellerolaria picridifolia (F.Muell.) G.L.Nesom

Synonyms
- Eurybia picridifolia F.Muell. (1853) (basionym); Olearia picridifolia (F.Muell.) Benth.

= Muellerolaria picridifolia =

Species of flowering plant

Muellerolaria picridifolia, commonly known as rasp scrub-daisy, is a species of flowering plant in the family Asteraceae and is endemic to southern continental Australia. It is a low, spreading shrub with narrowly egg-shaped or narrowly elliptic leaves, and blue, mauve or white and yellow, daisy-like inflorescences.

== Description ==
Muellerolaria picridifolia is a spreading shrub that typically grows to a height of up to about 50 cm (20 in), its branchlets and leaves covered with short, stiff hairs pressed against the surface. The leaves are narrowly elliptic or narrowly egg-shaped with the narrower end towards the base, 10–65 mm (0.39–2.56 in) long, 1–9 mm (0.039–0.354 in) wide and more or less sessile. The heads or daisy-like "flowers" are arranged singly or in small groups, on the ends of the branches or in leaf axils on a peduncle 15–85 mm (0.59–3.35 in) long, and are 20–25 mm (0.79–0.98 in) in diameter on a hemispherical involucre at the base. Each head has 20 to 30 white, blue, mauve or white ray florets, the ligule 12–13 mm (0.47–0.51 in) long, surrounding 40 to 80 yellow disc florets. Flowering occurs from July to November and the fruit is a glabrous achene 2.5–3.5 mm (0.098–0.138 in) long, the pappus 4–5 mm (0.16–0.20 in) long with 25 to 40 bristles.

== Taxonomy ==
This daisy was first formally described in 1853 by Ferdinand von Mueller who gave it the name Eurybia picridifolia in Linnaea: ein Journal für die Botanik in ihrem ganzen Umfange, oder Beiträge zur Pflanzenkunde, based on plant specimens that he collected in a rocky valley near Arkaba in South Australia. The specific epithet (picridifolia) means "Picris-leaved". In 1867 George Bentham changed the name to Olearia picridifolia in Flora Australiensis. In 2020 Guy L. Nesom placed the species in the newly-described genus Muellerolaria as M. picridifolia after Olearia had been found to be polyphyletic.

== Distribution and habitat ==
Rasp scrub-daisy grows in mallee and heath in scattered locations in the south of Western Australia, the south-east of South Australia, and in scattered locations in north-western Victoria.
