= False sandalwood =

False Sandalwood is a common name for several plants and may refer to:

- Adenanthera pavonina, false red sandalwood
- Eremophila mitchellii, a shrub or small tree native to Australia
- Myoporum platycarpum, endemic to Australia
- Myoporum sandwicense, endemic to Hawaiʻi
