= List of storms named Laura =

The name Laura has been used for a total of five tropical cyclones worldwide:

In the North Atlantic:

- Tropical Storm Laura (1971) – a system that formed off Panama, looped south of western Cuba, and landed in southern Belize
- Tropical Storm Laura (2008) – a large but short-lived system that remained in the open ocean
- Hurricane Laura (2020) – developed in the Caribbean Sea before growing into a powerful Category 4 hurricane in the Gulf of Mexico before making landfall in Louisiana, earliest twelfth named storm on record

The name was retired from use in the Atlantic basin after the 2020 season, and was replaced by Leah for the 2026 season.

In the Western Pacific:

- Typhoon Laura (1947) (T4710)

In the Southern Indian Ocean:

- Cyclone Laura (1967)

== See also ==
- Hurricane Laurie (1969) – a similar name that was used once in the Atlantic
