= SS Laura =

A number of steamships have carried the name Laura, including:

- SS Laura (1875), built as Roll Call in 1875, renamed Ellen in 1881 and then renamed Laura and purchased by Peter Mærsk-Møller in 1886
- SS Laura (1885), built for the London and South Western Railway, sold in 1927
- SS Laura (1908), built for A/S Dampskibs Selskap Vesterhavet, sold in 1917
