= 467 Laura =

Main-belt asteroid

Discovery
- Discovered by: Max Wolf
- Discovery site: Heidelberg Observatory
- Discovery date: 9 January 1901

Designations
- Pronunciation: /ˈlɔːrə/ Italian: [ˈlaura]
- Alternative designations: 1901 FY; 1954 OE; A924 RG

Orbital characteristics
- Epoch 31 July 2016 (JD 2457600.5)
- Uncertainty parameter 0
- Observation arc: 115.03 yr (42015 d)
- Aphelion: 3.26446 AU (488.356 Gm)
- Perihelion: 2.62441 AU (392.606 Gm)
- Semi-major axis: 2.94444 AU (440.482 Gm)
- Eccentricity: 0.1086874
- Orbital period (sidereal): 5.05 yr (1845.4 d)
- Mean anomaly: 5.2504112°
- Mean motion: 0° 11^{m} 42.269^{s} / day
- Inclination: 6.43615°
- Longitude of ascending node: 322.48119°
- Argument of perihelion: 91.31635°

Physical characteristics
- Dimensions: 41.96±3.2 km
- Synodic rotation period: 36.8 h (1.53 d)
- Geometric albedo: 0.0633±0.011
- Absolute magnitude (H): 10.9

467 Laura (1901 FY) is Main-belt asteroid discovered on 9 January 1901 by Max Wolf at Heidelberg. The semi-major axis of the orbit of 467 Laura lies just inside the 7/3 Kirkwood gap, located at 2.95 AU. It's named after the character Laura from Amilcare Ponchielli's opera La Gioconda.

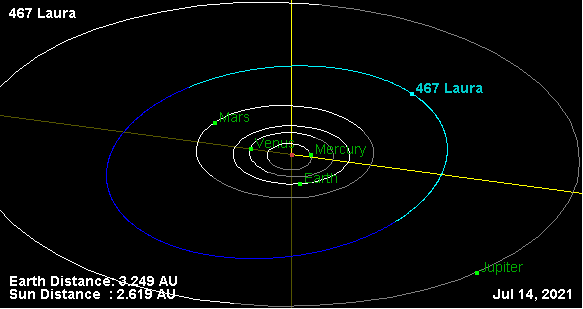
Laura's orbit

The Kirkwood gaps
