= Lincoln Conservation Park =

Protected area in South Australia

- IUCN category VI (protected area with sustainable use of natural resources)
- Location within South Australia
- Location: South Australia
- Nearest city: Port Lincoln.<
- Coordinates: 34°47′37″S 135°43′26″E
- Area: 1.034 km^{2} (0.399 sq mi)
- Established: 11 November 1993
- Governing body: Department for Environment and Water

Lincoln Conservation Park (formerly Lincoln Conservation Reserve) is a protected area in the Australian state of South Australia, located on the Eyre Peninsula within the gazetted locality of Tulka. It is situated on Section 490 in the cadastral unit of the Hundred of Lincoln approximately 15 kilometres (9.3 miles) southwest of Port Lincoln.

The conservation park was proclaimed on 7 December 2006 under the National Parks and Wildlife Act 1972, recognizing "its contribution to regional biodiversity conservation". The proclamation replaced the area's previous protected status as a conservation reserve, which had been declared under the Crown Lands Act 1929 on 11 November 1993 to conserve vegetation within the Coffin Bay – Jussieu Peninsula catchment zone.

In 2007, the conservation park was described by its managing authority as follows:

The eastern section of the park [sic] consists of undulating limestone plains with low laterite-capped hills, whereas the western section consists of undulating calcarenite plains overlain by sand dunes and coastal dunes or cliffs... Mallee vegetation formations cover most of the park, with coastal white mallee being the dominant species. The regionally rare purple-flowered mallee community is also conserved within this park [sic].

The conservation park is classified as an IUCN Category VI protected area.

== See also ==
- Protected areas of South Australia
- Lincoln National Park
