= Eyre Peninsula =

Peninsula in South Australia

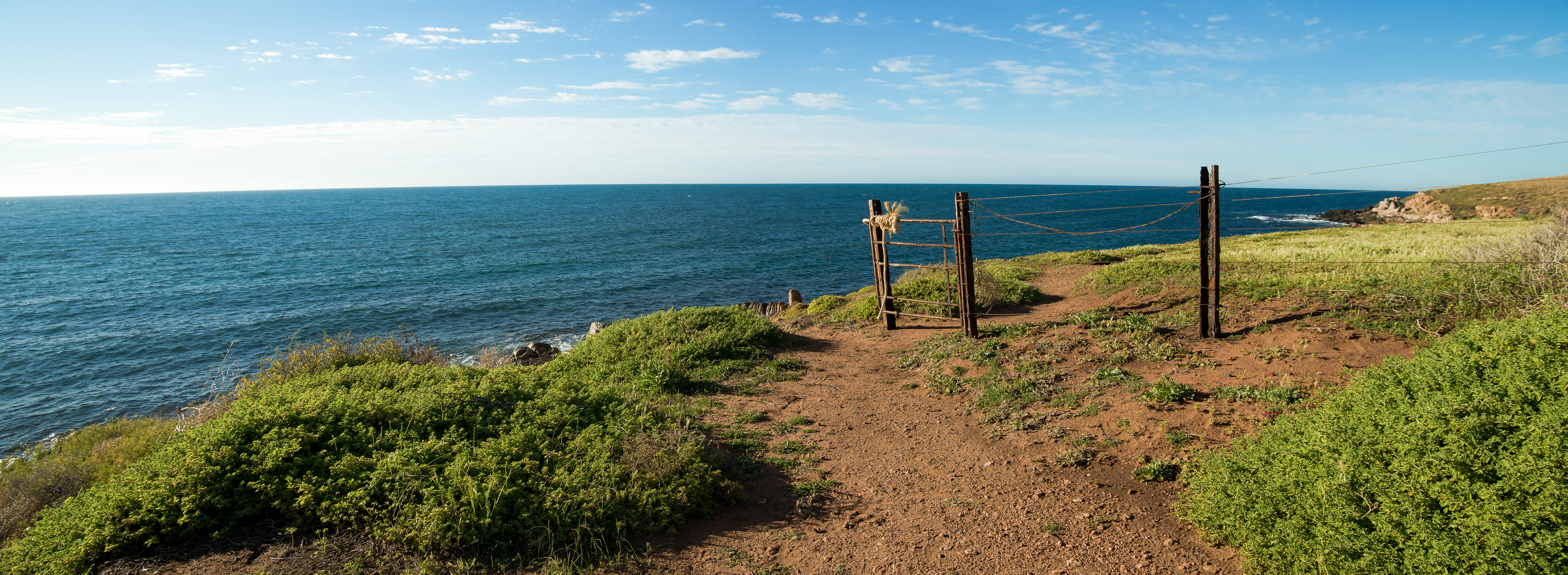
- Near Lipson Cove

- Coordinates: 34°S 136°E
- Country: Australia
- State: South Australia
- Region: Eyre Western; Far North
- LGA: See Local government areas

Government
  - State electorate: Flinders Giles
  - Federal division: Grey

Area
  - Total: 170,500 km^{2} (65,800 sq mi)

Population
  - Total: 58,700 (2011)
  - Density: 0.3443/km^{2} (0.8917/sq mi)
- Population; Area; Coordinates

The Eyre Peninsula is a triangular peninsula in South Australia. It is bounded by the Spencer Gulf on the east, the Great Australian Bight on the west, and the Gawler Ranges to the north.

Earlier called Eyre's Peninsula, it was named after explorer Edward John Eyre, who explored parts of the peninsula in 1839–41. The coastline was first charted by the expeditions of Matthew Flinders in 1801–02 and French explorer Nicolas Baudin around the same time. Flinders also named the nearby Yorke's Peninsula and Spencer's Gulph on the same voyage.

The peninsula's economy is primarily agricultural, with growing aquaculture, mining, and tourism sectors. The main towns are Port Lincoln in the south, Whyalla and Port Augusta in the northeast, and Ceduna in the northwest. Port Lincoln (Galinyala in Barngarla), Whyalla and Port Augusta (Goordnada) are part of the Barngarla Aboriginal country. Ceduna is within Wirangu country.

== Naming and extent ==
The peninsula was named after explorer Edward John Eyre on 7 November 1839 by George Gawler, the second Governor of South Australia.

The peninsula's coastline boundary was defined in 1839 as "Spencer's Gulf in its whole length, to the southern ocean from Cape Catastrophe to the western point of Denial Bay." Its northern boundary was described in 1978 as follows: "no official boundary [has] ever [been] proclaimed but the common sense choice would be to draw a straight line from Yorkey Crossing to the northernmost point of Denial Bay."

== Population ==
As at 30 June 2010, the peninsula had a population of 58,700 people. The peninsula is home to 3.6% of South Australia's population. An estimated 2,500 people, 4.4% of the population, is indigenous.

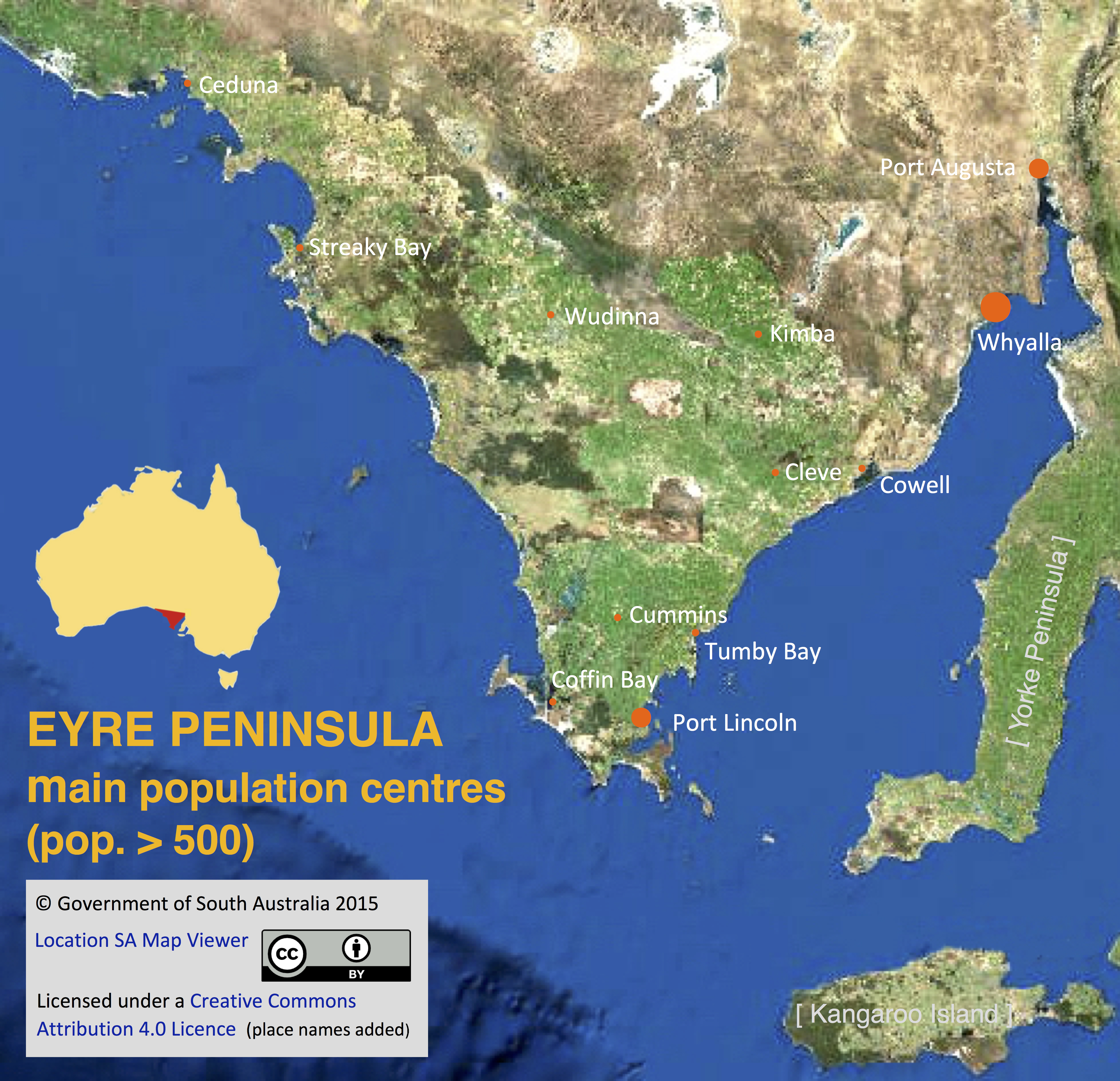
Eyre Peninsula towns and cities with a population of more than 500 (Australian census 2011)

== Economy ==
=== Primary industries ===
The major industry is farming — cereal crops, sheep, and cattle in the drier north, and more water-intensive activities such as dairy farming and a growing wine industry in the south. Many coastal towns have commercial fishing fleets, the largest at Port Lincoln. The town has previously harbored a large tuna-fishing fleet, which is gradually transforming its practice to fish farming with the growth of sea cage aquaculture for tuna and yellowtail kingfish. Oyster farming was established in the 1980s and occurs in several sheltered bays, including Coffin Bay, Franklin Harbour (near Cowell in Spencer Gulf) and Smoky Bay off the west coast.

=== Mining ===
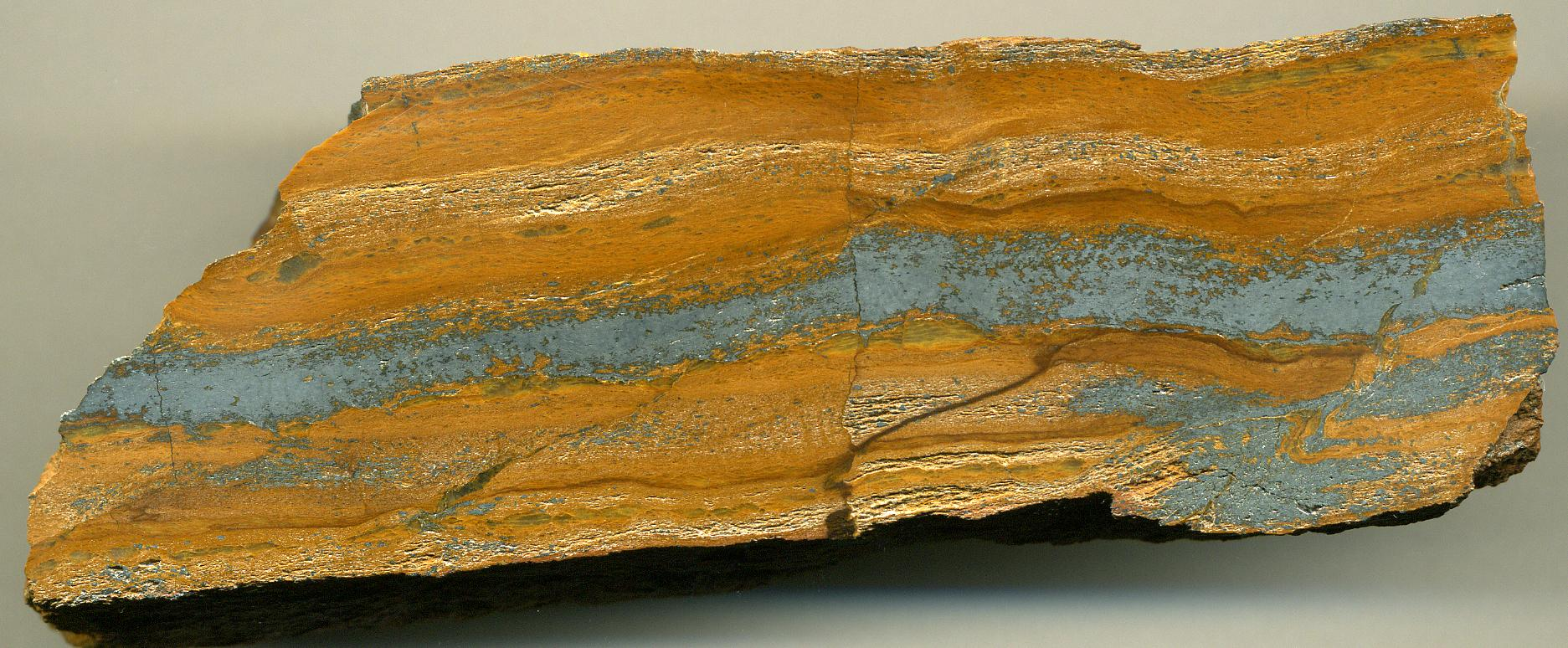
Banded iron formation, South Middleback Range, Eyre Peninsula. Orangish-brown = quartz mixed with limonite. Silvery-gray = hematite.

Since 1919, gypsum has been mined at Lake MacDonnell, the largest deposit of gypsum in the southern hemisphere, and is shipped from Thevenard. As of 2022, production is over 1 million tonnes per annum.

Iron ore is mined by Arrium in the Middleback Range near Iron Knob, inland from Whyalla. Some of the product is smelted to produce feedstock for the Whyalla Steelworks. Increasing volumes of iron ore are also being exported from Whyalla directly to customers in Asia.

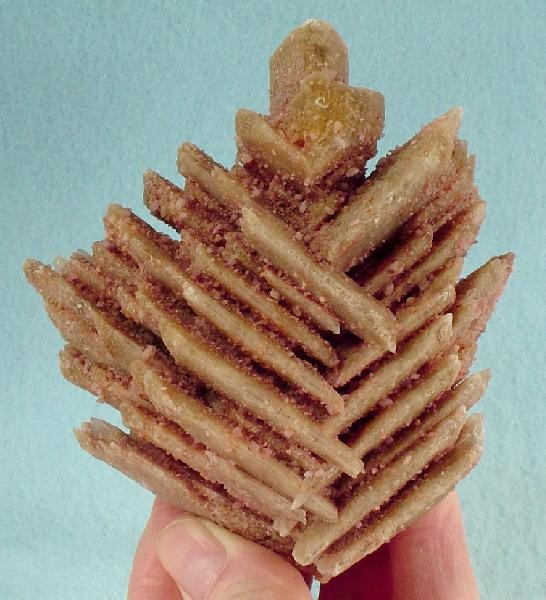
Unusual herringbone crystals of evaporite gypsum, from Sinclairs Gap Lake, Middleback Range, Eyre Peninsula. Size: 10.8 x 9.8 x 6.0 cm.

There is a commercial nephrite jade mine near Cowell, and jade souvenirs can be purchased in the town.

The peninsula has many small inactive mines and quarries. It is considered prospective for a variety of minerals, including graphite, coal, and uranium, with many deposits being proven in recent years.

The 2000s saw increased mineral exploration activity on the peninsula. In 2013, some of the more advanced mine development projects included: Ironclad Mining's Wilcherry Hill, Centrex Metals's Fusion Magnetite Project and Iron Road Limited's Central Eyre Iron Project.

Existing rail, power, and water supply infrastructure shortfalls continue to hamper new project development.

=== Tourism ===
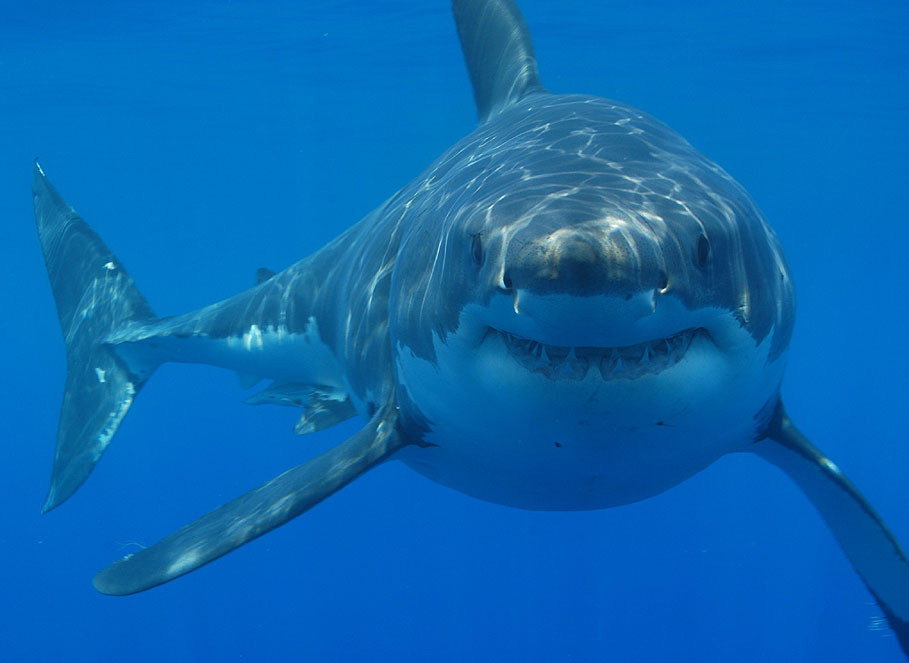
Cage-diving with great white sharks is possible for tourists off Eyre Peninsula.

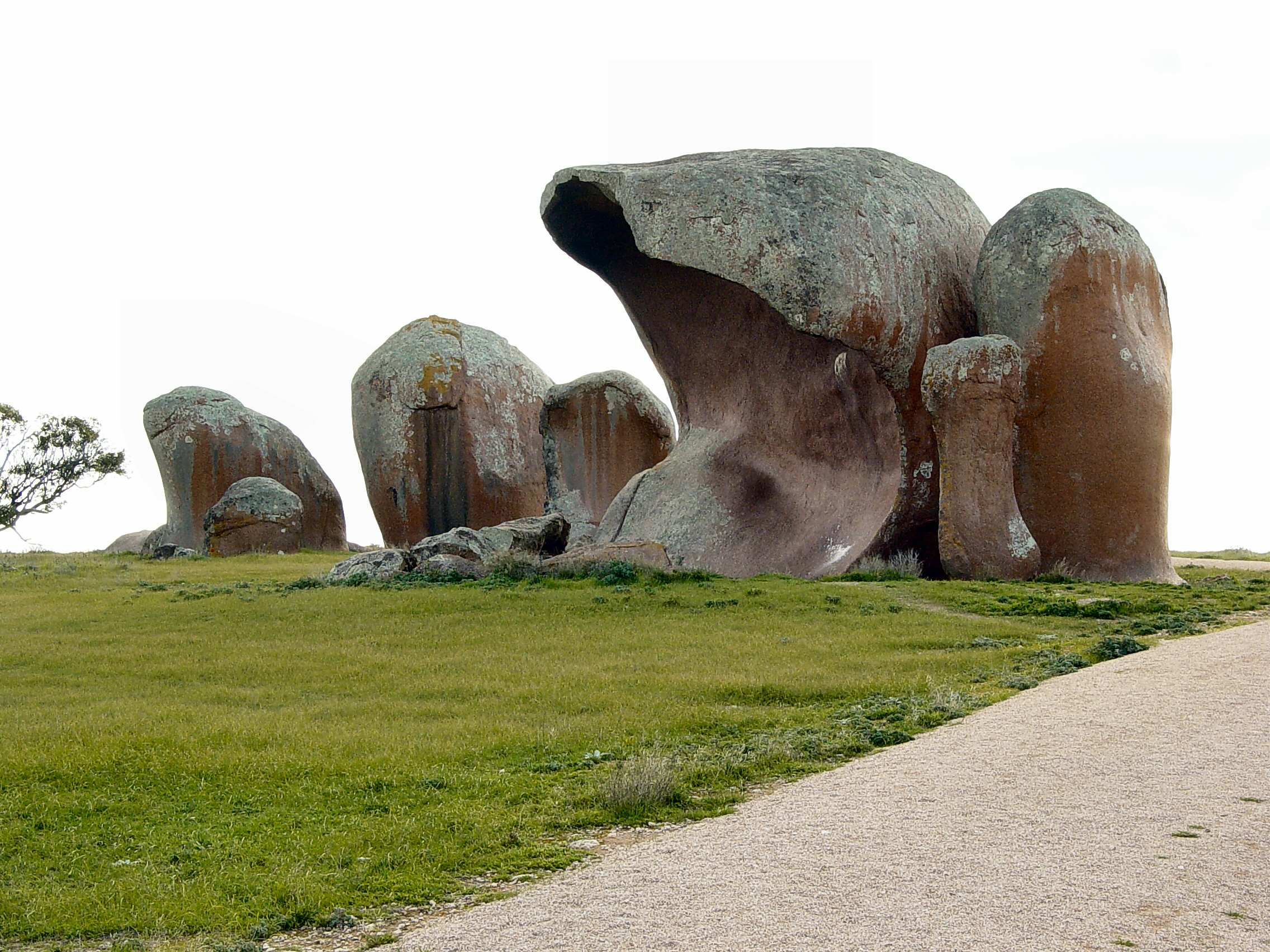
Murphy's Haystacks are a unique geological feature.

The Eyre Peninsula is promoted by Regional Development Australia Whyalla and Eyre Peninsula as the 'Seafood Frontier' due to the variety of seafood species in the region, both farmed and wild-caught. Key species are the southern bluefin tuna and yellowtail kingfish, which are farmed in Port Lincoln and Arno Bay, and Pacific oysters, which are grown in Coffin Bay, Cowell, Denial Bay, Smoky Bay, and Streaky Bay. Other seafood offerings include abalone, King George whiting, mussels, western king prawns and blue swimmer crabs.

Many natural heritage attractions can be found in the peninsula's three national parks, numerous conservation parks, and along the peninsula's extensive coastline.

Ecotourism operators offer visitors opportunities to experience many of the peninsula's iconic marine species either in or on the water.

From Whyalla, visitors can snorkel or dive off Point Lowly to witness the mass breeding aggregation of giant Australian cuttlefish, which occurs there from May to August each year.

From Port Lincoln, tourists can swim in a cage with southern bluefin tuna, with a colony of Australian sea lions, or enter a shark cage to observe great white sharks offshore near the Neptune Islands.

Ceduna lies to the east of the Nullarbor Plain, which is crossed by a stretch of the Eyre Highway running parallel to the Great Australian Bight. Oyster farm tours can be experienced at Smoky Bay, allowing visitors to see where oysters are grown. Recreational fishing for species such as King George whiting and blue swimmer crabs does not require a licence, although size, bag, and boat limits may apply.

On the west coast, tourists can snorkel with Australian sea lions and bottlenose dolphins in the sheltered waters of Baird Bay and observe southern right whales (and occasionally humpback whales) from the shore or by boat from Fowler's Bay from May to October.

Murphy's Haystacks are a unique geographical feature located between Streaky Bay and Port Kenny.

Artifacts from the Peninsula's pioneer and, to a lesser extent, indigenous heritage can be seen at a network of museums operated by the National Trust of South Australia, which include the Mount Laura Homestead Museum in Whyalla, the Tumby Bay National Trust Museum and the Koppio Smithy Museum. The Whyalla Maritime Museum's nautical theme commemorates the former Whyalla shipyards. Its displays include the World War II corvette HMAS Whyalla, which sits in dry-dock and is visible from the Lincoln Highway.

Fishing charters are offered to depart from many coastal towns, including Whyalla, Cowell, Tumby Bay, and Port Lincoln.

== Transport ==
=== Road ===
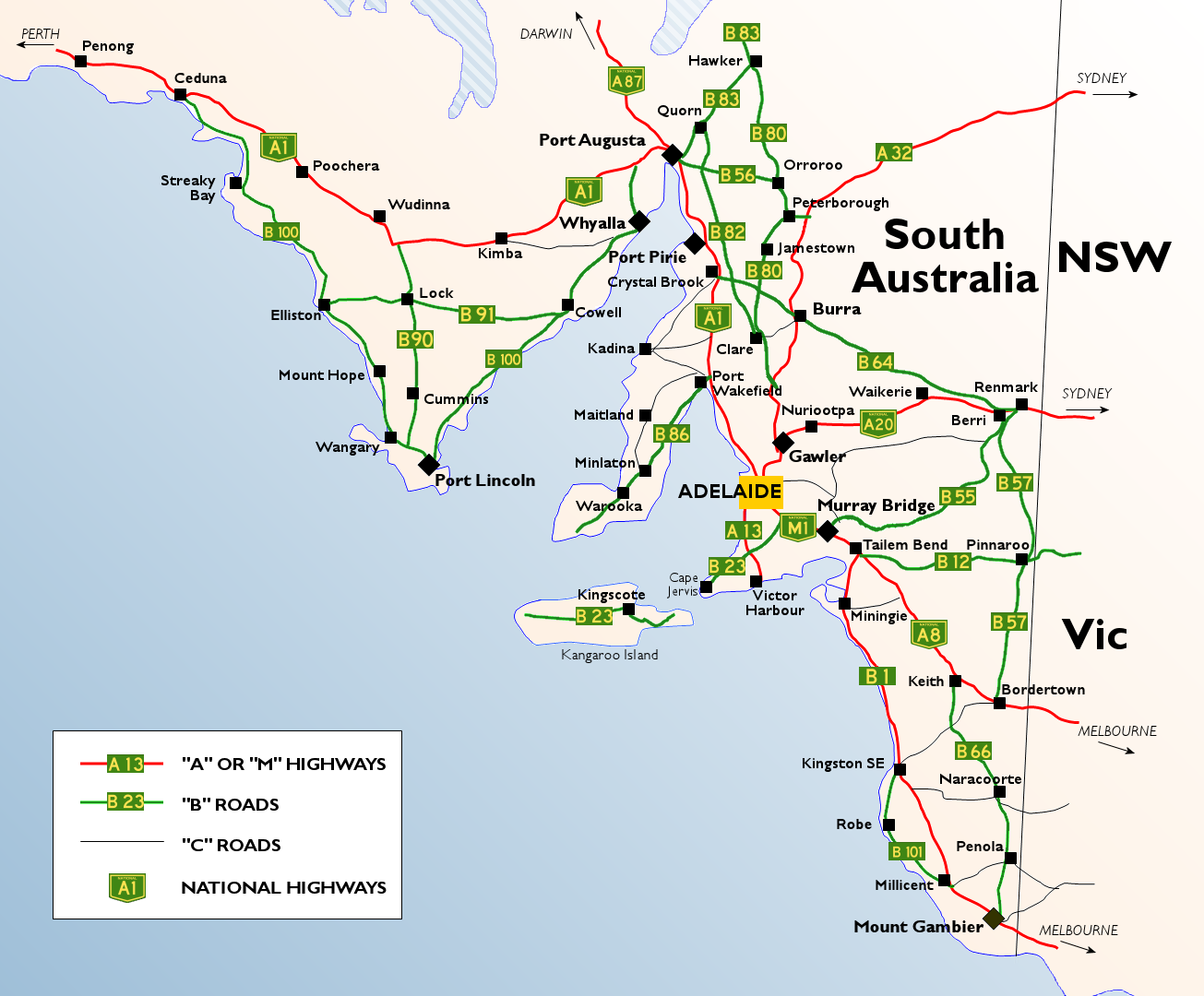
Highway map of South Australia, including highways on the Eyre Peninsula identified by their route number

Major population centres on the peninsula are connected by a network of highways. The Eyre Highway (Route number A1) runs east–west across the north side of the peninsula, while the Flinders Highway (Route number B100) and Lincoln Highway (Route number A100) follow the west and east coasts, meeting at Port Lincoln in the south. The Tod Highway (Route number B90) bisects the peninsula, running south–north from Port Lincoln through the town of Lock to meet the Eyre Highway at Kyancutta. The Birdseye Highway (Route number B91) bisects the peninsula from Elliston on the west coast and Flinders Highway through Lock and Cleve to the Lincoln Highway near Cowell.

=== Rail ===
The isolated Eyre Peninsula Railway serves the peninsula. Peaking at 777 kilometres in 1950, radiating out from the ports at Port Lincoln and Thevenard, today, only one 60-kilometre section remains open. It is operated by Aurizon. It has always been isolated from the main network. A proposal to link it with the rest of the network at Port Augusta was rejected in the 1920s and again in the 1950s.

From 1966 until 1989, BHP operated the Coffin Bay Tramway from Coffin Bay to Port Lincoln.

The BHP Whyalla Tramway operated from the iron ore mines in the Middleback Ranges to the smelter and port at Whyalla. The Whyalla railway line to Port Augusta are also connected to the national rail network.

=== Sea ===
A car and passenger ferry links the Eyre peninsula at Lucky Bay to the Yorke Peninsula at Wallaroo.

=== Proposed future expansion of transport systems ===
To facilitate prospective mines, new freight corridors and ports have been proposed to export minerals via Spencer Gulf. New port proposals are in place at Port Bonython, Lucky Bay, Cape Hardy and Sheep Hill (Lipson Cove). A proposal to export iron ore from Port Lincoln by Centrex Metals was approved but abandoned after strong public opposition. Port Bonython Fuels, a future fuel distribution hub, has been approved to be constructed at Port Bonython to aid the development of the mining industry. Once constructed and operational, fuel will be delivered to towns and mine sites by road tankers up to A-triple class.

Sheep Hill/Port Spencer will be completed by 2023.

== Water supply ==
Potable water is scarce on the peninsula. Presently, water is pumped several hundred kilometres from the Murray River to the town of Whyalla through the Morgan-Whyalla pipeline. Underground water resources are suffering from gradually increasing salinity. The only reliable surface flows are from the Tod River and its main tributary, Pillaworta Creek, which are captured by the Tod Reservoir. The reservoir was built to augment the groundwater supply of Port Lincoln and was constructed in the early 1920s. It was taken offline in the early 2000s due to concerns over rising salinity and contamination from agricultural chemicals. SA Water has investigated potential locations for seawater desalination plants to address future water security problems.

As of January 2014, no plants are proposed to be built for domestic or agricultural supply, though one currently exists and two have been proposed to serve the mining industry exclusively. The existing plant is located at Whyalla and is operated by Arrium, and plants are proposed for Point Lowly and Lipson Cove to serve BHP and Centrex Metals, respectively.

== Administrative divisions ==
=== Local government areas ===
The peninsula includes the local government areas of Ceduna, Cleve, Elliston, Franklin Harbour, Kimba, Lower Eyre Peninsula, Port Lincoln, Streaky Bay, Tumby Bay, Wudinna and Whyalla, as well as the western portion of the City of Port Augusta. The area at the northern end of the peninsula is within the Pastoral Unincorporated Area of South Australia where municipal services are provided by the Outback Communities Authority to communities, including Iron Knob.

=== State and federal electorates ===
The peninsula is within the boundaries of the federal division of Grey and the state electoral districts of Flinders and Giles.

=== Regions ===
The peninsula is within the extent of the following two South Australian government regions – the Eyre Western and the Far North.

== Conservation ==
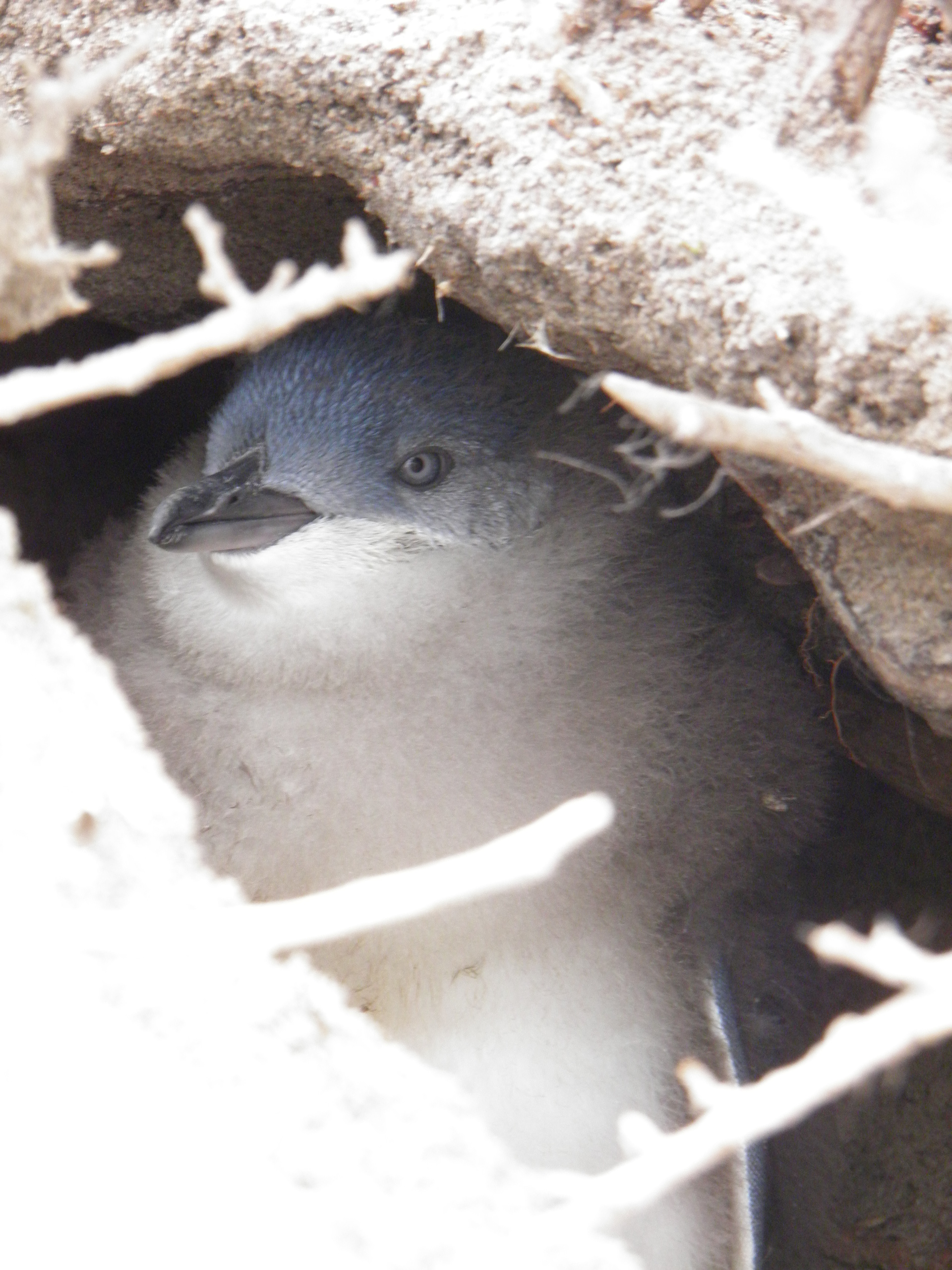
Little penguins nest in Eyre Peninsula's coastal protected areas.

=== Protected areas ===
As at 2016, the following protected areas were located within the peninsula:

- Conservation parks – Acraman Creek, Barwell, Baird Bay Islands, Bascombe Well, Calpatanna Waterhole, Cape Blanche, Caralue Bluff, Carappee Hill, Cocata, Corrobinnie Hill, Darke Range, Franklin Harbor, Gawler Ranges, Heggaton, Hincks, Ironstone Hill, Kathai, Kellidie Bay, Kulliparu, Lake Gilles, Lake Newland, Laura Bay, Lincoln, Malgra, Middlecamp Hills, Moody Tank, Mount Dutton Bay, Munyaroo, Murrunatta, Peachna, Pinkawillinie, Point Labatt, Pureba (part), Rudall, Sceale Bay, Searcy Bay, Shannon, Sheoak Hill, Sleaford Mere, The Plug Range, Tucknott Scrub, Venus Bay, Verran Tanks, Wanilla, Wanilla Land Settlement, Wharminda, Whyalla, Wittelbee and Yeldulknie.
- Conservation reserves – Buckleboo, Cortlinye, Cunyarie, Lacroma, Moongi, Mootra, Pinkawillinie Reservoir, Poolgarra and Tola.
- National parks – Coffin Bay, Lincoln and Gawler Ranges.
- Recreation parks – Caratoola.
- Wilderness protection areas – Hambridge, Hincks and Memory Cove.

== Disasters ==
The peninsula coastline is littered with shipwrecks from the 19th and 20th centuries.

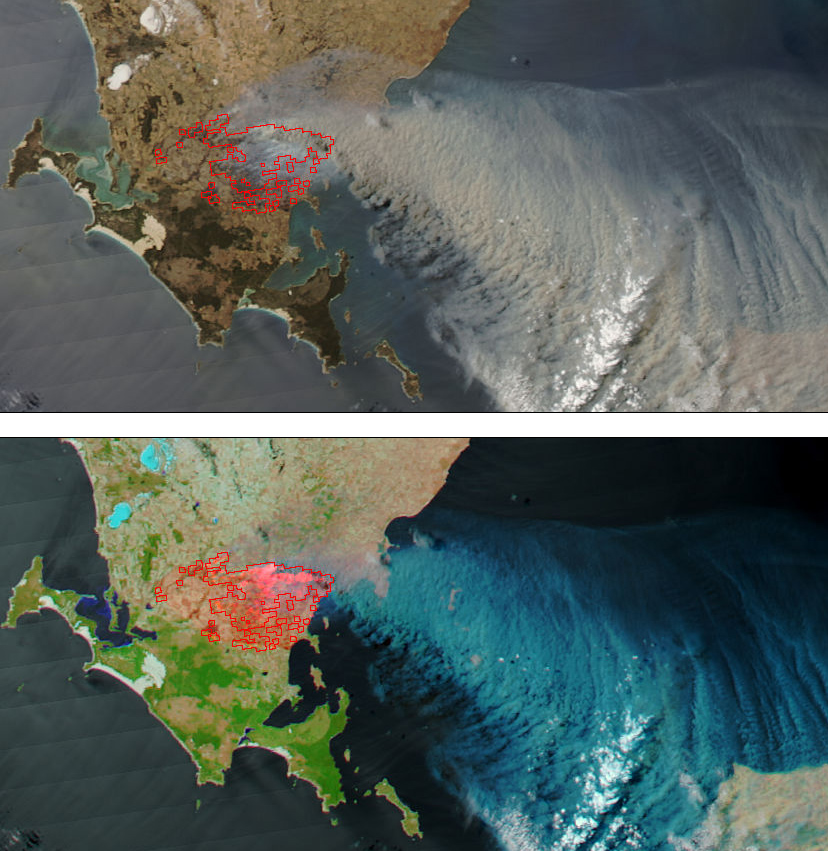
Bushfires on southern Eyre Peninsula in 2005

In the 1920s, seven people were killed during the construction of the Tod Reservoir, north of Port Lincoln.

In January 2005, nine people were killed in the major Eyre Peninsula Bushfire.

== Physiography ==
The area is also known as the Eyre Coastal Plain, is part of the Eyre Yorke Block bioregion, and is a distinct physiographic section of the larger Eucla Basin province, which in turn is part of the larger West Australian Shield division.
