= County of Le Hunte =

Le Hunte South Australia
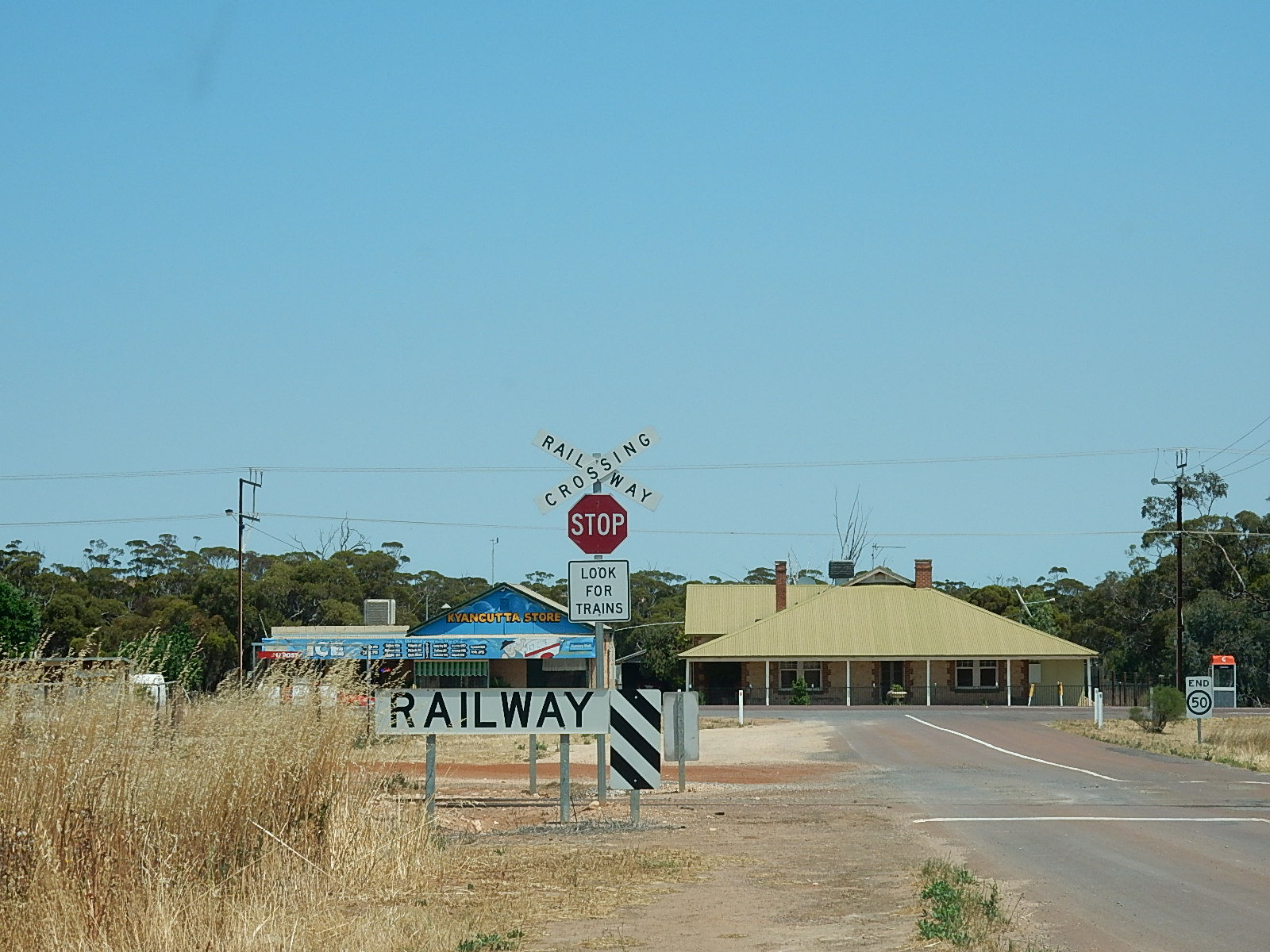
- Railway crossing, Kyancutta

- Coordinates: 33.060480°S 135.583650°E
- Established: 1908
- LGA(s): District Council of Kimba (part); Wudinna District Council (part); Pastoral Unincorporated Area
- Region: Far North; Eyre Western
Lands administrative divisions around Le Hunte:
| Robinson | Bosanquet | Hore-Ruthven |
| Robinson | Le Hunte | Buxton |
| Musgrave | Musgrave; Jervois | Jervois |
- Footnotes: Coordinates; Adjoining counties

County of Le Hunte is a cadastral unit located in the Australian state of South Australia that covers land located in the centre of Eyre Peninsula. It was proclaimed in 1908 and named after George Le Hunte who was the Governor of South Australia from July 1903 to February 1909.

== Description ==
The County of Le Hunte covers a part of South Australia associated with the western side of the centre of Eyre Peninsula located south of the Gawler Ranges. It is bounded to the west by the County of Robinson, to the south by the counties of Musgrave and Jervois, and to the east by the County of Buxton and to the north by County of Bosanquet.

The county is served by the following major roads - Eyre Highway which passes through the county from east to west and the Tod Highway which passes from the south and which meets the Eyre Highway at Kyancutta.

Settlements include Minnipa, Yaninee, Pygery, Wudinna and Kyancutta which are located (from west to east) along the Eyre Highway and Warramboo being located on the Tod Highway.

The Port Lincoln to Wudinna line of the Eyre Peninsula Railway passes through the county from the south to the west following the alignment of the Tod Highway and then the alignment of the Eyre Highway west of Kyancutta.

Land use within the county includes primary industrial activity such as “cereal and legume cropping, pastures, and grazing of sheep and cattle,” and mining. The following protected areas are located in the county - Cocata Conservation Park in the south-east corner while the Pinkawillinie Conservation Park occupies most of the county's northern-eastern corner.

Its extent includes parts of the local government areas of the Wudinna District Council on its western side and the District Council of Kimba on its eastern side with parts of the state's Pastoral Unincorporated Area located on its northern and eastern sides.

== History ==
The County of Le Hunte was proclaimed on 4 November 1908.

The naming of the county after Governor Le Hunte who was the Governor of South Australia from July 1903 to February 1909, by the South Australian government follows “a precedent which was established in 1842’ when a county was named after Governor Gawler.

The following hundreds have been proclaimed within the county - Kappakoola, Mamblin, Minnipa, Palabie, Pygery, Wannamana, Warramboo, Wudinna and Yaninee in 1913, Pinbong in 1922, Pordia in 1925, Cootra and Koongawa in 1926, Hill in 1927, Cocata in 1928, and Corrobinnie and Peella in 1957.

== Constituent hundreds ==
=== Location of constituent hundreds ===
The hundreds are laid out in four rows in the west–east direction as follows:

1. Cocata, Kappakoola, Warramboo and Cootra from west to east along the county's eastern boundary.
2. Pordia, Palabie, Wannamana, Mamblin and Koongawa
3. Yaninee, Pygery, Wudinna, Hill and Peella, and
4. The most northerly row of hundreds consists of the Hundreds of Minnipa and Pinbong in the north-west corner of the county and Corrobinnie in the north-east corner of the county separated by an area of land that has not been proclaimed as one or more hundreds.

=== Hundred of Cocata ===
The Hundred of Cocata (33°15′44″S 135°14′39″E) was proclaimed on 9 August 1928. It covers an area of 307.6 square kilometres (118.75 sq mi) and is named after Cocata Hill, a hill located within the extent of the hundred. It is mostly located within the gazetted locality of Cocata, with a section in Mount Damper.

=== Hundred of Cootra ===
The Hundred of Cootra (33°16′06″S 135°53′29″E) was proclaimed on 4 November 1926. It covers an area of 310 square kilometres (119.5 sq mi) and is derived from the aboriginal name for “a rockhole in vicinity.” It includes the gazetted locality of Cootra, the southern section of Koongawa and a small section of Warramboo.

=== Hundred of Corrobinnie ===
The Hundred of Corrobinnie (32°50′05″S 135°54′54″E) was proclaimed on 7 February 1957. It is divided between the gazetted localities of Buckleboo and Pinkawillinie.

=== Hundred of Hill ===
The Hundred of Hill (32°59′07″S 135°44′22″E) was proclaimed on 24 November 1927. It covers an area of 260 square kilometres (100 sq mi) and is named after Lionel Hill, a former member of the South Australian Parliament and a former Premier of South Australia. It is located entirely within the broader gazetted locality of Pinkawillinie.

=== Hundred of Kappakoola ===
The Hundred of Kappakoola (33°15′57″S 135°27′34″E) was proclaimed on 31 July 1913. It covers an area of 307 square kilometres (118.5 sq mi) and is derived from Kappakoola Hill, a hill located within the hundred. It is nearly entirely located within the broader gazetted locality of Warramboo, with a small section in Cocata.

=== Hundred of Koongawa ===
The Hundred of Koongawa (33°07′26″S 135°54′48″E) was proclaimed on 4 November 1926. It covers an area of 247 square kilometres (95.5 sq mi) and is derived from an aboriginal word for “good.” The northern section is located within the gazetted locality of Pinkawillinie, while the southern section is located in Koongawa.

=== Hundred of Mamblin ===
The Hundred of Mamblin (33°07′11″S 135°44′23″E) was proclaimed on 31 July 1913. It covers an area of 260 square kilometres (100 sq mi) and is derived from Mamblin Hill, a hill located within the hundred. More than half of the hundred is located in the gazetted locality of Kyancutta, with a smaller section in Koongawa and a very small section in Warramboo.

=== Hundred of Minnipa ===
The Hundred of Minnipa (2°50′23″S 135°13′30″E) was proclaimed on 31 July 1913 and covers an area of 260 square kilometres (100 sq mi). A majority of the hundred is contained in the broader gazetted locality of Minnipa, while the eastern and south-eastern section is contained in Yaninee.

=== Hundred of Palabie ===
The Hundred of Palabie (33°07′42″S 135°23′53″E) was proclaimed on 31 July 1913. It covers an area of 260 square kilometres (100 sq mi) and is derived from an aboriginal name. The hundred contains the south-western half of the broader gazetted locality of Wudinna, while a small section in the south-west corner of the hundred forms part of Cocata.

=== Hundred of Peella ===
The Hundred of Peella (32°56′57″S 135°54′58″E) was proclaimed on 7 February 1957. Most of the hundred is contained in the broader gazetted locality of Pinkawillinie, while the north-eastern corner lies in Buckleboo.

=== Hundred of Pinbong ===
The Hundred of Pinbong (32°49′58″S 135°23′10″E) was proclaimed on 26 October 1922. It covers an area of 260 square kilometres (100 sq mi) and is derived from the aboriginal name for “a rockhole in the area.” The hundred is divided between three gazetted localities, containing the northern section of Pygery, part of the north-eastern section of Yaninee and a small southern section of Gawler Ranges.

=== Hundred of Pordia ===
The Hundred of Pordia (33°07′49″S 135°13′54″E) was proclaimed on 13 August 1925. It covers an area of 260 square kilometres (100 sq mi) and is derived from Kappakoola Hill, a hill located within the hundred. The majority of the locality lies within the gazetted locality of Mount Damper, with a section of Cocata in the south of the hundred and Wudinna in the east.

=== Hundred of Pygery ===
The Hundred of Pygery (32°59′21″S 135°23′40″E) was proclaimed on 31 July 1913. It covers an area of 260 square kilometres (100 sq mi) and is derived from the aboriginal name for “a a rockhole in the area.” It includes the southern section of the gazetted locality of Pygery, with sections of Yaninee in the north-west and Wudinna in the south-east.

=== Hundred of Wannamana ===
The Hundred of Wannamana (33°07′42″S 135°34′00″E) was proclaimed on 31 July 1913. It covers an area of 247 square kilometres (95.5 sq mi) and is derived from “a native name.” Most of the hundred is contained within the gazetted locality of Kyancutta, including Kyancutta township, with sections of Warramboo and Wudinna.

=== Hundred of Warramboo ===
The Hundred of Warramboo (33°15′57″S 135°40′38″E) was proclaimed on 31 July 1913. It covers an area of 307 square kilometres (118.5 sq mi) and is derived from the aboriginal name for “a lake located in the vicinity.” Most of the hundred is contained within the gazetted locality of Warramboo, with small sections in Koongawa, Kyancutta.

=== Hundred of Wudinna ===
The Hundred of Wudinna (32°59′11″S 135°33′51″E) was proclaimed on 31 July 1913. It covers an area of 260 square kilometres (100.5 sq mi) and is derived from the aboriginal name for a hill located within the hundred. Most of the hundred is contained within the broader gazetted locality of Wudinna, with small sections in Kyancutta and Pinkawillinie.

=== Hundred of Yaninee ===
The Hundred of Yaninee (32°59′07″S 135°13′35″E) was proclaimed on 31 July 1913. It covers an area of 258 square kilometres (99.5 sq mi) and is derived from Lake Yaninee, a lake located within the hundred. Most of the hundred is located within the gazetted locality of Yaninee, with a small section in the north-west corner in Minnipa.

== See also ==
- Lands administrative divisions of South Australia
