= County of Bosanquet =

Bosanquet
- Cadastral division
- Coordinates: 32.475650°S 135.572270°E
- Country: Australia
- State: South Australia
- Region: Far North; Eyre and Western
- LGA(s): Pastoral Unincorporated Area Wudinna District Council
- Established: 1913

Area
  - Total: 5,200 km^{2} (2,000 sq mi)
Lands administrative divisions around Bosanquet
Dufferin
Dufferin; Robinson	Bosanquet	Hore-Ruthven
Robinson	Le Hunte	Buxton
- Coordinates; Adjoining counties

The County of Bosanquet is a cadastral unit in the Australian state of South Australia that covers land both in the north of the Eyre Peninsula and to the peninsula's north. It was proclaimed on 23 October 1913 and was named after Sir Day Hort Bosanquet, the Governor of South Australia from 1909 to 1914.

== Description ==
The county covers land extending from the southern end of Lake Gairdner in the north-east to the southern side of the Gawler Ranges in the south-west. Most of its extent is within the Eyre Peninsula because the peninsula’s northern boundary passes through the county in an east-west direction. It is bounded to the west by the counties of Dufferin and Robinson, to the south by the County of Le Hunte, and to the east by the County of Hore-Ruthven.

There are no formal settlements within the county. The following gazetted localities, mainly based on pastoral leases, are within the county: Thurlga and parts of Buckleboo, Carriewarloo, Cooyerdoo, Corunna Station, Gawler Ranges, Hiltaba, Kolendo, Lake Gairdner, Mount Ive, and Yardea.

A road labelled as Nonning Road and then as Hiltaba Road passes through the county in an east-west direction on its way from Iron Knob in the east. Other roads passing through the county include the Mail Run Road, which runs from Nonning Road in the east to Hiltaba Road in the west via the locality of Thurlga, Buckleboo Road which runs from the Eyre Highway in the south to Mail Run Road in the north, Yardea Road which runs from the Eyre Highway in the south via the locality of Gawler Ranges to Hiltaba Road in the north, and Skull Camp Tank Road which runs from the junction of Nonning and Hiltaba Roads towards Kingoonya in the north.

The county's land is mainly used for primary production and conservation, the latter including the Gawler Ranges National Park and Lake Gairdner National Park.

While most of the county is located within the state’s Pastoral Unincorporated Area and the state’s Far North region, the Hundred of Pildappa is entirely located within the local government area of Wudinna District Council and the state’s Eyre and Western region.

== History ==
The County of Bosanquet was proclaimed on 23 October 1913 and was named after Sir Day Hort Bosanquet who was the Governor of South Australia from 18 February 1909 to 22 March 1914.

== Constituent hundred ==
As of 2014, the Hundred of Pildappa (32°42′05″S 135°13′30″E) has been the only hundred proclaimed within the county.

It was proclaimed on 23 October 1913. It covers an area of 260 square kilometres (100 sq mi) and is named after Pildappa Hill (Pildappa Rock), a feature located within the hundred and whose name is derived from a "native word for 'rockwater'". Its extent is almost entirely occupied by the gazetted locality of Minnipa, with a portion of its south-east corner being within the gazetted locality of Yaninee.

== See also ==
- Lands administrative divisions of South Australia
