= Eyre =

Eyre may refer to:

== People and fictional characters ==
- Eyre (given name), a list of people
- Eyre (surname), a list of people and fictional characters

== Places ==
=== Australia ===
==== South Australia ====
- Eyre Peninsula (disambiguation)
- Eyre, South Australia, a suburb
- Lake Eyre

==== Western Australia ====
- Electoral district of Eyre
- Eyre River (Western Australia)
- Esperance Plains, biogeographic region of Australia also known as Eyre Botanical District

=== Elsewhere ===
- Eyre, Saskatchewan, Canada
- Eyre, Isle of Skye, Highland, Scotland
- Eyre, Raasay, a location in Highland, Scotland
- Eyre (river), France
- Eyre River (New Zealand)
- Eyre Creek (disambiguation), various creeks in Australia, New Zealand and Canada
- Eyre Hall, Virginia, United States, a plantation house on the National Register of Historic Places, home of the Eyre family
- Eyre Square, Galway, Ireland

== Other uses ==
- Eyre (legal term), in medieval England
- Eyre Highway, a highway connecting South Australia and Western Australia
- Eyre Bird Observatory, Western Australia
- Eyre Telegraph Station, Western Australia

== See also ==
- Eyre legend, about the Eyre/Ayre family
- Eyre Methuen, a publishing company
- Éire, the island of Ireland
- Ayre
