= Gawler Ranges, South Australia =

Gawler Ranges South Australia
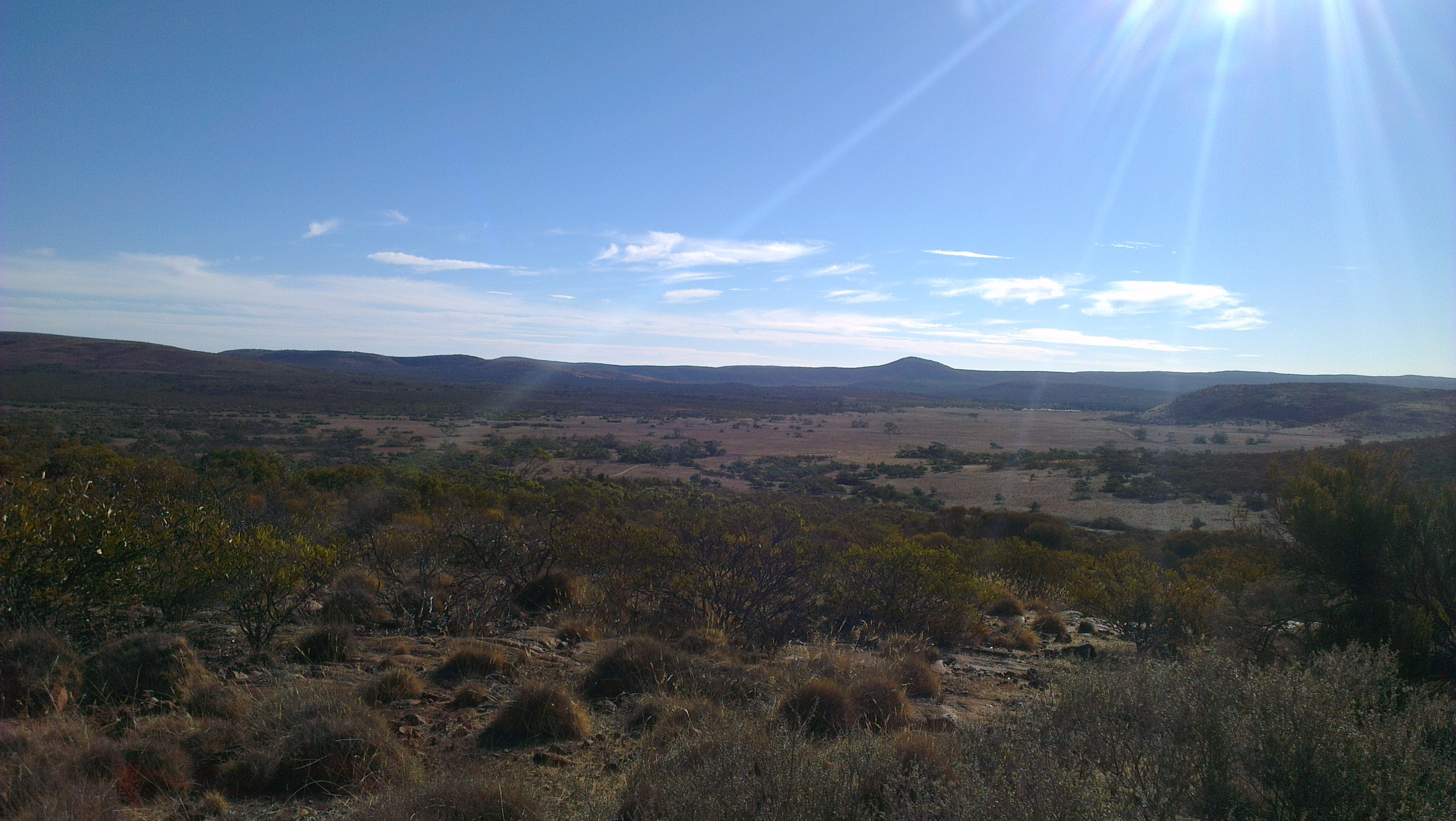

- Coordinates: 32.54°S 135.33°E
- Population: 0 (SAL 2016)
- Established: 2013
- Postcode(s): 5655
- Time zone: ACST (UTC+9:30)
  - Summer (DST): ACST (UTC+10:30)
- Location: 380 km (236 mi) NW of Adelaide city centre; 48 km (30 mi) N of Wudinna
- LGA(s): Pastoral Unincorporated Area; Wudinna District Council
- Region: Far North
- State electorate(s): Giles
- Federal division(s): Grey
Mean max temp	Mean min temp	Annual rainfall
24.7 °C; 76 °F	11.2 °C; 52 °F	274.1 mm 10.8 in
Suburbs around Gawler Ranges:
See Surrounding localities
- Footnotes: Location; Coordinates; Climate

Gawler Ranges is a locality in the Australian state of South Australia located on Eyre Peninsula about 380 kilometres (240 miles) north-west of the Adelaide city centre and about 48 kilometres (30 miles) north of the town centre of Wudinna and which is associated with the protected area known as the Gawler Ranges National Park.

Gawler Ranges covers an area of land in the southern part of the Gawler Ranges is located within the boundary of the national park as well as land to both the south and the west of the mountain range.

Its boundaries were created on 26 April 2013 along with the adoption of the “long established local name.” The boundaries were located in order “to ensure the whole of the Gawler Ranges National Park is within the locality of the same name” with the result that the “existing locality of Paney” ceased to exist after being divided up between Gawler Ranges and the locality of Pygery located to the south. The name itself is derived from both the mountain range and the national park.

Land use within Gawler Ranges is divided between conservation and other uses permitted by planning legislation such as agriculture with the former use being associated with the national park which fully occupies the locality's eastern side.

Gawler Ranges is located within the federal Division of Grey, the state electoral district of Giles, the Wudinna District Council, the Pastoral Unincorporated Area of South Australia and the state's Far North region.

== Surrounding localities ==
Gawler Ranges is bounded by the following localities gazetted under the South Australian Geographical Names Act 1991:

- Northwest: Kondoolka.
- North: Kondoolka, Hiltaba and Yardea.
- Northeast: Thurlga.
- East: Thurlga and Buckleboo.
- Southeast: Pinkawillinie.
- South: Kaldoonera, Lockes Claypan, Bockelberg, Minnipa, Yaninee, Pygery and Pinkawillinie.
- Southwest: Narlaby.
- West: Pureba and Yantanabie.

== See also ==
- Gawler (disambiguation)
