= Eyre River =

Eyre River may refer to:

- Eyre River (Western Australia)
- Eyre (river), France
- Eyre River, New Zealand

== See also ==
- Eyre Creek (disambiguation)
