= Cocata Conservation Park =

Protected area in South Australia

- IUCN category VI (protected area with sustainable use of natural resources)
- Location within South Australia
- Location: South Australia
- Nearest city: Kyancutta.
- Coordinates: 33°17′23″S 135°14′41″E
- Area: 167.62 km^{2} (64.72 sq mi)
- Established: 11 November 1993
- Governing body: Department for Environment and Water

Cocata Conservation Park is a protected area in the Australian state of South Australia located on the Eyre Peninsula in the gazetted localities of Cocata and Warramboo about 26 kilometres (16 mi) south-west of the town centre in Kyancutta.

The conservation park was proclaimed on 20 August 2009 under the state's National Parks and Wildlife Act 1972 in respect to crown land formerly dedicated as conservation reserve under the state's Crown Land Act 1929 on 11 November 1993. The dedicated land is located in the cadastral unit of the hundreds of Cocata, Kappakoola and Pordia. The proclamation in 2009 permits access under the state's Mining Act 1971.

Its name was derived from Cocata Hill, a feature near the conservation park, although the name is ultimately derived from "'Cokata', the name of the Aboriginal people who occupied the land 'between Mount Wedge and the Gawler Ranges'". As of June 2016, the conservation park covered an area of 167.62 square kilometres (64.72 sq mi).

The conservation park is classified as an IUCN Category VI protected area.

== See also ==
- Protected areas of South Australia
