= Warramboo, South Australia =

Warramboo
- Town
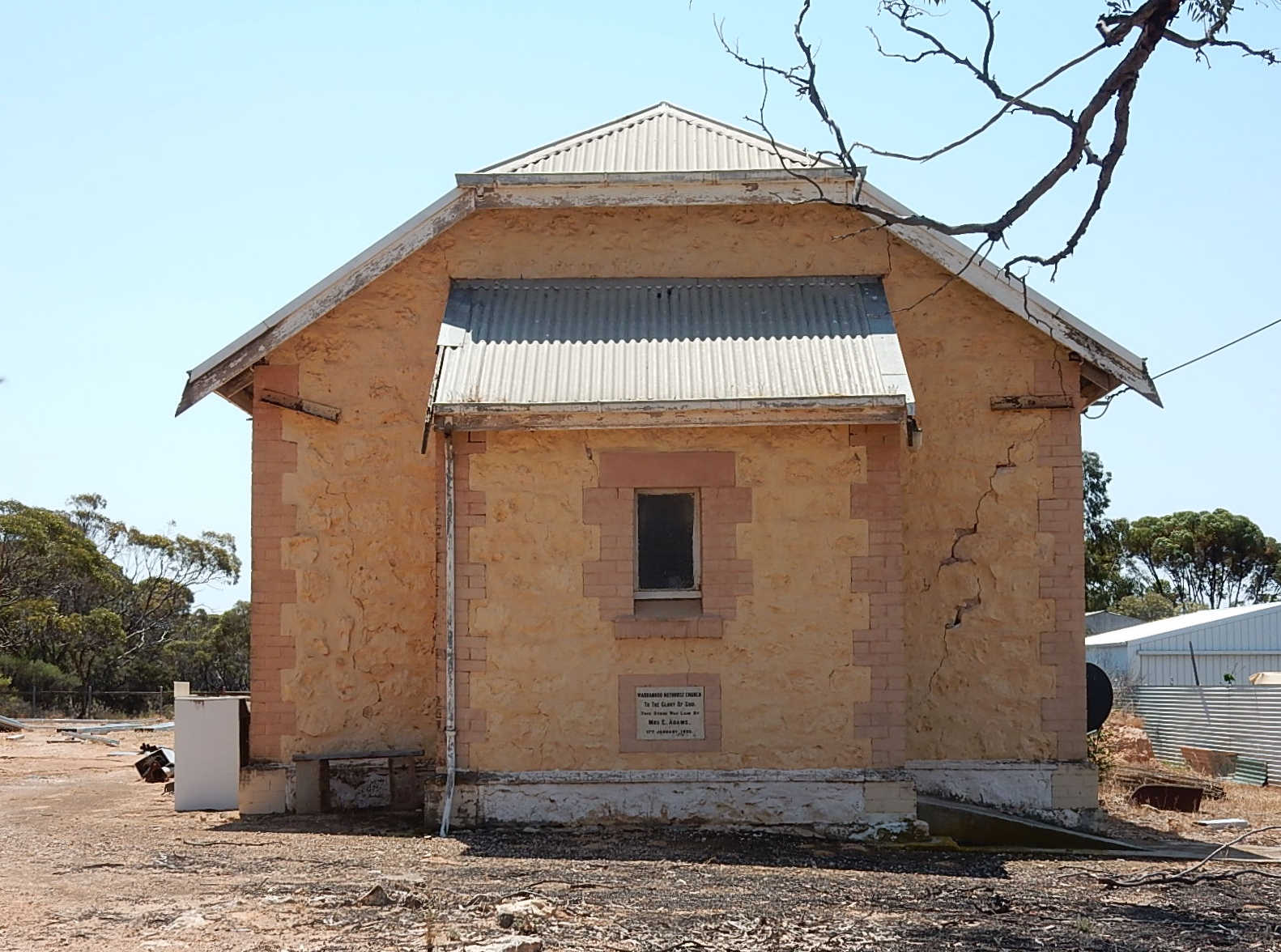
- Warramboo Methodist Church

- Coordinates: 33°14′24″S 135°35′42″E
- Country: Australia
- State: South Australia
- Region: Eyre Western
- LGA: Wudinna District Council
- Location: 334 km (208 mi) NW of Adelaide; 26 km (16 mi) SE of Wudinna; 189 km (117 mi) NW of Port Lincoln
- Established: 19 July 1917 (town); 11 November 1999 (locality)

Government
  - State electorate: Flinders
  - Federal division: Grey

Population
  - Total: 108 (2016 census)
- Time zone: UTC+9:30 (ACST)
  - Summer (DST): UTC+10:30 (ACST)
- Postcode: 5650
- County: Le Hunte
- Mean max temp: 25.2 °C (77.4 °F)
- Mean min temp: 9.3 °C (48.7 °F)
- Annual rainfall: 313.2 mm (12.33 in)
Localities around Warramboo
Wudinna	Wudinna; Kyancutta	Kyancutta; Koongawa
Cocata	Warramboo	Koongawa
Palkagee	Palkagee; Ulyerra; Hambidge	Hambidge

Warramboo (wɔrˑræmˑbʉː) is a locality in the Australian state of South Australia located on the Eyre Peninsula about 334 kilometres (208 mi) north-west of the state capital of Adelaide and about 26 kilometres (16 mi) south-east of the municipal seat of Wudinna. It is 189 kilometres (117 mi) north of Port Lincoln on the Tod Highway and is the north-western terminus of the wheat haulage lines radiating from Port Lincoln on the Eyre Peninsula Railway. The railway line was built from 1907–1915 to develop the cereal industry. The grain silos are a distinctive local landmark of the town.

At the 2006 census, Warramboo and the surrounding area had a population of 248. Warramboo has little in the way of services, with no shops or petrol stations. However, the local post office still services the local community, which is mainly engaged in agriculture. Warramboo has one of the largest (historical) windmills in the southern hemisphere, located ~10 km west of the township and still present today. The water from this mill was unfortunately not suitable for people or livestock due to the high salt concentration.

== History ==
The traditional inhabitants of the Warramboo district and much of the South-West region of Eyre Peninsula are the Nawu/Nauo people. The word 'warramboo' means 'a lake/place of water', referring to the prevalence of samphire swamps in the region.

A public school was erected at Warramboo during early European settlement and remained a source of education for children 5–12 years old from 1920 until its closure in 2002. The town hall was also built in the 1920s. The original wood and iron hall was demolished and a new stone hall built in its place in 1934.

The local Australian rules football team (Central Eyre Football Club) was formed from an amalgamation of the Warramboo and Kyancutta Football Clubs in 1986. The Central Eyre Football Club was one of six teams in the Mid West Football League.

== Mining proposal ==
Iron Road Limited has plans to develop a magnetite mine and infrastructure near Warramboo. The Central Eyre Iron Project is planned to produce a high quality, low impurity iron concentrate for steel manufacturers, at an output of 24 million tonnes per annum of approximately 67 per cent iron concentrate over almost 30 years. The company has acquired land for a new deep water port at Cape Hardy on the western shore of Spencer Gulf, which would be connected to Warramboo by a 148 kilometres (92 mi) utilities corridor in which would be a substantial standard gauge heavy haul railway, service road, power line and water pipeline.

== See also ==
- Cocata Conservation Park
