= Buddicom =

Buddicom is a surname. Notable people with this surname include:

- Jacintha Buddicom (1901–1993), English poet
- Robert Arthur Buddicom (1874–1951), English-Australian scientist and entrepreneur, better known as Robert Bedford
- William Buddicom (1816–1887), British engineer
