= Eyre Peninsula (disambiguation) =

Eyre Peninsula is a peninsula in the Australian state of South Australia.

Eyre Peninsula may also refer to:

- Eyre Peninsula Railway, a railway
- Eyre Peninsula Tribune, a newspaper
- Eyre Peninsula blue gum, a species of tree
- Eyre Peninsula bushfire, 2005, a bushfire

== See also ==
- District Council of Lower Eyre Peninsula
- Railway stations on the Eyre Peninsula
- Eyre (disambiguation)
