= Australian Farmer =

Coordinates: 33°2′49.25″S 135°27′37.61″E

The Australian Farmer
- Big Farmer
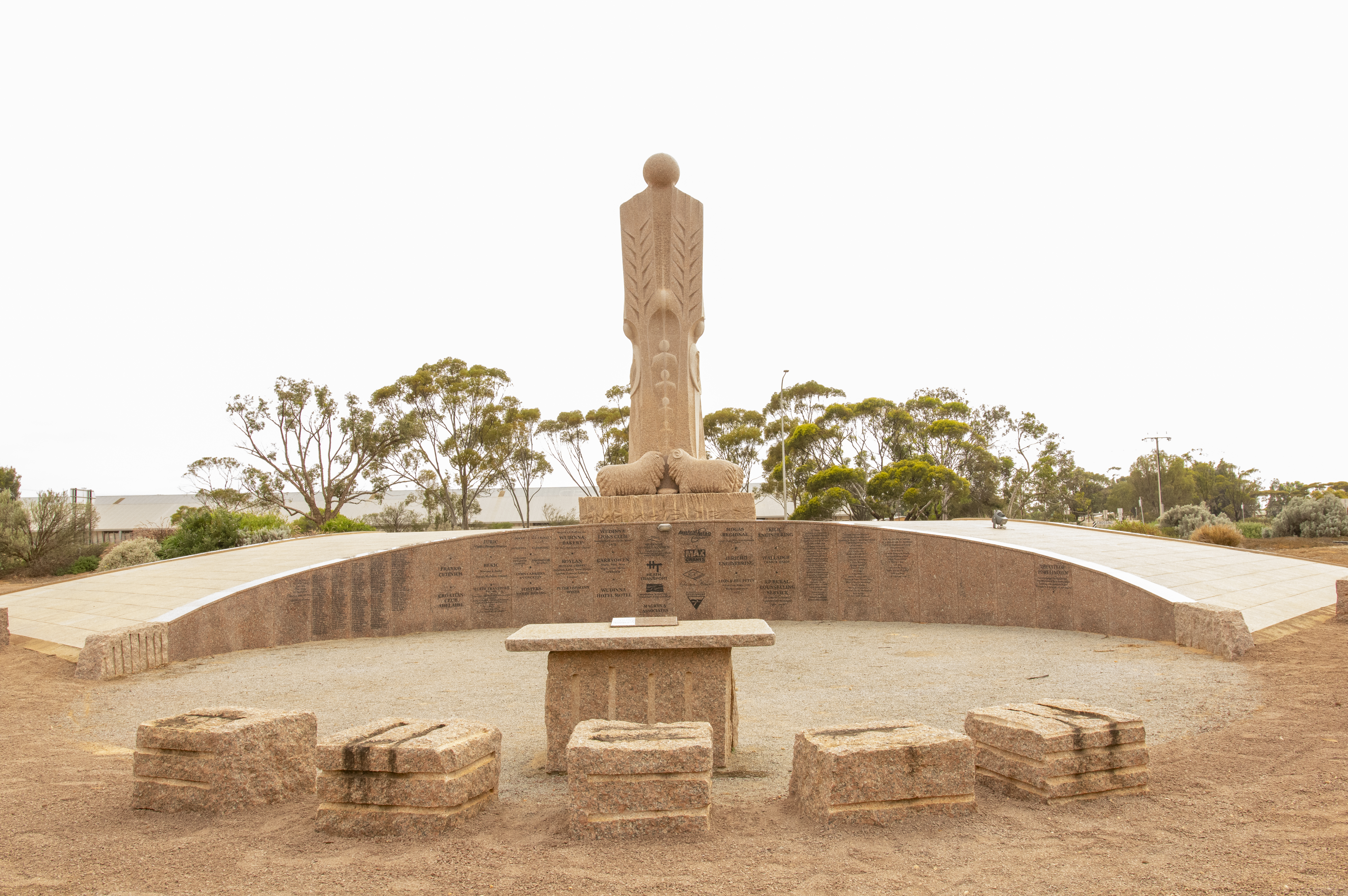
- Artist: Marijan Bekic
- Year: 17 April 2009 (construction started in 2007)
- Type: Statue
- Medium: Granite sculpture
- Dimensions: 8 m (26 ft)
- Weight: 70 tonnes (69 long tons; 77 short tons)
- Location: Wudinna, South Australia, Australia

The Australian Farmer (also known as the Big Farmer) is a statue located in Wudinna, South Australia. Regarded as one of Australia's Big Things, the granite sculpture stands at 8 metres (26 ft) in height, and weighs in the vicinity of 70 tonnes. It took 17 years to produce from initial proposal to the final unveiling in 2009, and two years for the artist, Marijan Bekic (with the assistance of his son, David), to carve. The stylised work of a farmer represents the early settlers of the region, with carvings symbolising grain and sheep found within the sculpture.

== History ==
The former District Council of Le Hunte (now Wudinna District Council) first proposed the idea of a community project in 1992, and the focus quickly moved to the construction of a memorial to the early settlers of the region. Given that the area is well known for its granite, it was decided that the project should incorporate the material, and a request for tender was announced in 1999. Croatian-born artist Marijan Bekic responded to the advertisement, producing a scale model of his concept, and this was shown to the local community.

With the community's support of the concept in hand, the council sought a grant to fund the project. Although this was not forthcoming, land was donated by the Wudinna & Districts Telecentre, various companies provided sponsorship, and local residents offered food and accommodation for the artist. The result was that the project commenced in 2007, with a projected construction time of twelve months.

The project ended up taking the artist and his son two years to complete, and it was unveiled on 17 April 2009. The unveiling was preceded by a number of local events, including a live radio broadcast by the Australian Broadcasting Corporation's Peter Goers. The official launch was attended by over 1000 people, with Federal and State politicians Rowan Ramsey and Liz Penfold making an appearance.

In August 2009, the Australian Farmer was nominated for a Ruby Award in the "Community Impact (over $100,000)" category.

== Design and construction ==
Standing at 8 metres (26 ft) in height, the work was hand-carved from 70 tonnes (69 long tons; 77 short tons) of local granite.

The sculpture is a stylised representation of a farmer. While it takes a basic human form, the top represents the Sun, while in the body are carved grain crops. Sheep are placed at the foot of the statue, representing the sheep farmers in the district as well as creating the feet of the figure when viewed from a distance.
