= Day Bosanquet =

Former Governor of South Australia and Royal Navy Admiral (1843–1923)

Admiral Sir Day Bosanquet GCMG GCVO KCB
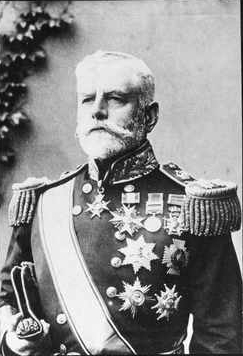

16th Governor of South Australia
- In office 18 February 1909 – 22 March 1914
- Monarchs: Edward VII; George V
- Premier: Thomas Price; Archibald Peake; John Verran; Archibald Peake
- Preceded by: Sir George Le Hunte
- Succeeded by: Sir Henry Galway

Personal details
- Born: 22 March 1843 Alnwick, Northumberland
- Died: 28 June 1923 (aged 80) Newbury, Berkshire

Military service
- Allegiance: United Kingdom
- Branch/service: Royal Navy
- Years of service: 1857–1908
- Rank: Admiral
- Commands: East Indies Station; North America and West Indies Station; Portsmouth
- Battles/wars: Second Opium War

Admiral Sir Day Hort Bosanquet, GCMG, GCVO, KCB (22 March 1843 – 28 June 1923) was a British politician and senior officer in the Royal Navy, and brother of scientist and music theorist Robert Bosanquet and philosopher Bernard Bosanquet. He served as the Governor of South Australia from 18 February 1909 until 22 March 1914.

== Naval career ==
Born in Alnwick in Northumberland, Bosanquet joined the Royal Navy in 1857. He was present at the taking of Canton.

He was appointed Commander-in-Chief, East Indies Station in 1899, and served as such until June 1902, when he returned home, and was promoted to vice-admiral on 1 July 1902. Two years later he was appointed Commander-in-Chief, North America and West Indies Station in 1904 and Commander-in-Chief, Portsmouth in 1907. He retired from this post and the Royal Navy on 23 March 1908.

From February 1909 to March 1914, Bosanquet served as Governor of South Australia.

== Personal life ==
He was a major landholder around Llanwarne, Herefordshire in England, living at Brom-y-clos. Bosanquet's daughter Beatrice Mary (b. 1881, d. 1 Sept, 1957) married Vice-Admiral Sir Raymond Fitzmaurice in 1919. Bosanquet died at Newbury, Berkshire on 28 June 1923.

== Honours ==
Knight Grand Cross of the Order of St Michael and St George (GCMG)	1914
Knight Grand Cross of the Royal Victorian Order (GCVO)	1907
Knight Commander of the Order of the Bath (KCB)	1905
Second China War Medal with clasps "Canton 1857", "Taku Forts 1858"	1861
Order of the Red Eagle, 1st Class	Prussia
Commander Grand Cross of the Order of the Sword	Sweden

== See also ==
- County of Bosanquet

Military offices
Preceded by Sir Archibald Douglas	Commander-in-Chief, East Indies Station; 1899–1902	Succeeded by Sir Charles Drury
Preceded by Sir Archibald Douglas	Commander-in-Chief, North America and West Indies Station; 1904–1907	Succeeded by Vacant (next held by Sir Christopher Cradock)
Preceded by Sir Archibald Douglas	Commander-in-Chief, Portsmouth; 1907–1908	Succeeded by Sir Arthur Fanshawe
Government offices
Preceded by Sir George Le Hunte	Governor of South Australia; 1909–1914	Succeeded by Sir Henry Galway
