= Cocata, South Australia =

Cocata South Australia
- Coordinates: 33.288540°S 135.3021°E
- Population: 0 (SAL 2016)
- Established: 1928
- Postcode(s): 5654
- Location: 27 km (17 mi) south-west of Wudinna
- LGA(s): Wudinna District Council
- State electorate(s): Stuart
- Federal division(s): Grey
Localities around Cocata:
Mount Damper	Mount Damper; Wudinna	Wudinna
Mount Wedge	Cocata	Warramboo
Mount Wedge	Coolillie	Palkagee
- Footnotes: Coordinates

Cocata is a rural locality in the Eyre and Western region of South Australia.

The area was informally known as Cocata from the 1800s. Explorer John Charles Darke passed through the area on his 1844 expedition. A survey of the Cocata area in 1893 noted that "the land fit for agriculture was chiefly confined with a radius of one and a half miles of Mount Damper, Kolballa, Cocata, Ucontitchie and Pordia Hills, and consists of heavily-timbered mallee land with belts of pines, bushes and teatree, besides small grassy plans fringed with stunted wattle". It noted that there were soakage wells at Cocata Hill and at Koballa Hill, "each having a poor supply of fresh water", and that the soil was unfit for dams. It also reported that a track had been established from the Cocata area to the port at Venus Bay. Transport proved an early challenge, with local advocacy for improved roads and a railway to reduce the challenges of moving material.

The name for the Hundred of Cocata, which was created on similar boundaries to the present locality, was approved by the Nomenclature Committee on 20 June 1928; it was surveyed into sections for pastoral selection soon after. The modern bounded locality was created in November 1999 in respect of the long-established name.

In 1938, a weekly mail service to Cocata was introduced. The area had its own school for several decades from around the early 1920s; in 1926 it was referred to as one of "a number of South Australian schools with a roll call to which only six or seven students answer".

Much of the southern section of the Cocata locality is taken up by the Cocata Conservation Park. Ucontitchie Hill, which lies towards the northern end of Cocata, is listed on the South Australian Heritage Register as a designated place of geological significance.
