= Pygery =

Pygery South Australia
- Coordinates: 33°01′0″S 135°25′0″E
- Population: 72 (2016 census)
- Postcode(s): 5655
- Location: 569 km (354 mi) NW of Adelaide; 265 km (165 mi) W of Port Augusta; 218 km (135 mi) N of Port Lincoln; 6 km (4 mi) NW of Wudinna
- LGA(s): Wudinna District Council
- State electorate(s): Flinders
- Federal division(s): Grey

Pygery is a town in South Australia on the Eyre Peninsula and on the Eyre Highway, 569 kilometres (354 mi) north-west of the state capital, Adelaide. The town is part of the Wudinna District Council local government area. The town name is derived from the Aboriginal word paitjariti meaning "fighting place".

At the 2016 census, the locality of Pygery had a population of 72.
