= Robert Bedford =

Scientist and entrepreneur (1874–1951)

- Born: Robert Arthur Buddicom; 7 November 1874; Ticklerton, Shropshire, England
- Died: 14 February 1951 (aged 76); Kyancutta, South Australia
- Burial place: Kyancutta, South Australia, as Robert Bedford
- Other names: Robert Arthur Bedford
- Spouses: Laura Lucie Finlay (m. 1900; div. 1920) Ethel Hilda Lewis (m. 1921)
- Parents: William Squire Buddicom (father); Elizabeth Haughton Buddicom, née Hornby (mother)

Robert Bedford (born Robert Arthur Buddicom; 7 November 1874 – 14 February 1951) was an English-Australian scientist, museum curator, and entrepreneur. He is best known for his collection housed in Kyancutta Museum, founded by him in 1929, and for his work on archeocyathinae (marine sponge fossils of the Cambrian era) and meteors.

== Early life and education ==
Robert Arthur Buddicom was born at Ticklerton, Shropshire, in England. His father was a landowner, William Squire Buddicom, and his mother Elizabeth Haughton (née Hornby).

He was educated at Charterhouse School and Uppingham School, where his strongest subjects were metalwork, Greek and Latin verse, and electrical apparatus.

His great-uncle, William Barber Buddicom, discouraged him from pursuing an engineering career, so Buddicom studied biology and chemistry, and completed his science degree at Keble College, Oxford in 1897. He was an Oxford biological scholar at the marine biology station at Naples, Italy, where he presented a paper on the potential for life in all matter.

== Career ==
Buddicom worked as a scientist in Freiberg in Germany as well as in Birmingham and Shrewsbury.

He was a Fellow of the Geological Society of London from 1899 to 1910.

He worked at two museums in England: in London, he worked at the Natural History Museum in Kensington; and in Plymouth, he was curator of the Plymouth City Museum and Art Gallery in 1900–01.

He was a demonstrator and lecturer at London Hospital Medical College from 1906 to 1914.

He was involved in court action in February 1915 when he was a director of Stolz Electrophone Company and found to have been involved in misrepresentation in a prospectus.

Having acquired land in New South Wales, Australia, after his divorce from first wife Laura Lucie Finlay (m. 17 January 1900), he migrated to Australia under the name Robert Bedford, with two children and his second wife, Ethel Hilda Lewis (m. 25 February 1921). Eschewing New South Wales, he instead settled at Kyancutta on a 2,000-acre (810 ha) wheat farm on the Eyre Peninsula in South Australia.

He served there as a doctor, veterinary surgeon, radio station proprietor (establishing "5RB" in 1924), and post office operator. He constructed an aerodrome and established the short-lived Eyre Peninsula Airways (1929–1935), as well as operating a range of other ventures in the town, including a flour mill.

Bedford founded the Australian Country Library Association in the 1930s, but it did not last. He sent accurate weather reports on the area to Adelaide, leading to Kyancutta's establishment as an official weather station.

Bedford undertook many field trips, collecting fossils and Aboriginal artefacts. The first, in 1927, was to Nildottie and Swan Reach on the Murray River, and Ardrossan on the Yorke Peninsula for archeocyathinae (marine sponge) fossils. In 1928 he travelled to Lake Callabonna, a dry salt lake in the Far North of South Australia, where he collected Diprotodon bones and petroglyphs.

During three separate trips between 1931 and 1933, Bedford analysed the meteorite craters at Henbury in the Northern Territory, his excavations uncovering black silica glass and iron shale balls. Some of the material from Henbury was sent to the British Museum in London. He was also responsible for preserving meteorites at Kyancutta, and became known as an expert on meteorites.

His work on archaeocyaths and related fossils from the Ajax Mine near Beltana in the Flinders Ranges, based on his field work between around 1932 until 1945, led to the description of 30 new genera and 99 new species. (Note: ADB says 32 new species and eight new genera, but the numbers in the body of the article are from the newer scientific paper.) Bedford self-published five taxonomic papers based on his own research as Memoirs of the Kyancutta Museum, 1-6 (Adelaide, 1934-39).

Bedford carefully arranged his collections, which he housed in the Kyancutta Museum and Library, which he established in 1929. Also housed in his new museum were items that he had collected in the UK and had sent to Australia by his sister in 1923. Many of the meteorites were purchased by the Australian National University during 1961-2, where they are housed in the Research School of Earth Sciences as the Bedford Meteorite Collection. The museum remained open to the public until 1971. Almost all of the remaining collections of meteorites, minerals, and fossils were sold to the National Museum of Victoria in Melbourne.

His work was not respected by the South Australian Museum, who opposed his admission to the Museum Association of Australia and New Zealand. However, Kyancutta Museum did become an institutional member of the association.

== Public office and other roles ==
In 1928, Bedford founded the Kyancutta branch of the South Australian Wheat-growers' Association, and in 1933 he drafted a constitution for the Australian Wheatgrowers' Federation.

During 1930, he led a short-lived campaign that promoted a proposal for a new state of Eyre Peninsula, separate from South Australia.

He was a councillor for Kyancutta Ward on the Le Hunte District Council in 1934-35, and supported the South Australian Centre Party.

== Later life, death, and legacy ==
During the Second World War, Bedford acted as a volunteer air observer. In his later years, he became obsessed with trying revive the Kyancutta aerodrome.

Robert Bedford died on 14 February 1951, survived by his wife, two sons, and three daughters.

His papers are often referenced in international research about archaeocyaths.
