= Kyancutta, South Australia =

Kyancutta South Australia
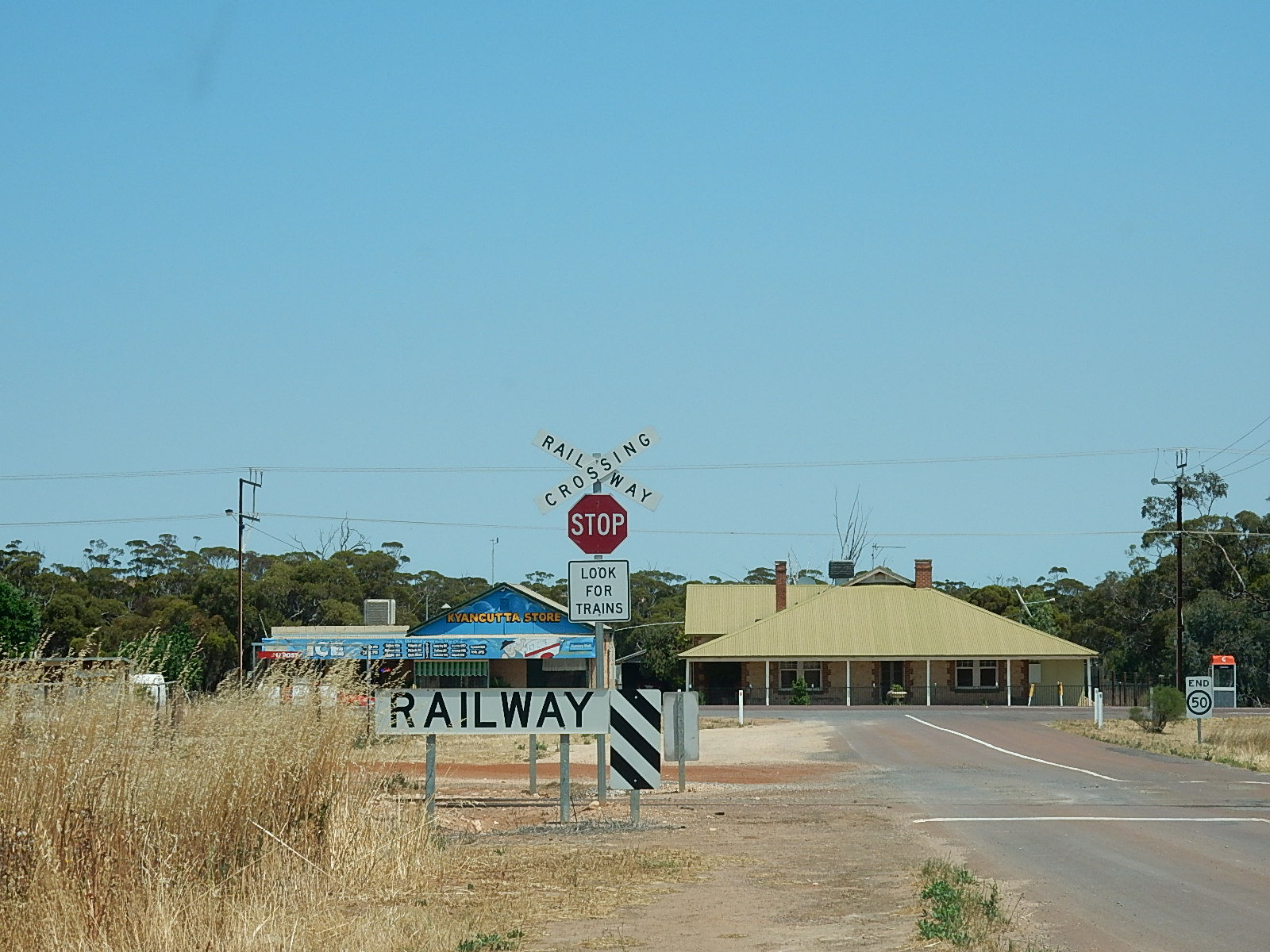

- Coordinates: 33°08′S 135°33′E
- Population: 79 (2016 census)
- Established: 1917
- Postcode(s): 5651
- Elevation: 59 m (194 ft)
- Location: 558 km (347 mi) northwest of Adelaide; 13 km (8 mi) southeast of Wudinna; 89 km (55 mi) west of Kimba
- LGA(s): Wudinna District Council
- State electorate(s): Flinders
- Federal division(s): Grey
Mean max temp	Mean min temp	Annual rainfall
25.2 °C; 77 °F	9.3 °C; 49 °F	310.7 mm 12.2 in
Localities around Kyancutta:
Wudinna		Pinkawillinie
	Kyancutta	Koongawa
Cocata	Warramboo
- Footnotes: Climate Localities

Kyancutta is a small wheatbelt town at the junction of the Eyre and Tod Highways on the Eyre Peninsula in South Australia. Once a busy town with an airport, Kyancutta is now nearly a ghost town, acting only as a centre for the agricultural districts surrounding it, as well as passing tourists.

== History ==
The town was established in 1917 to support the surrounding agricultural lands. The name is thought to be derived from the Aboriginal kanjakatari; kanja – "stone" and katari – "surface water", implying water in rocks. Another possible origin is that the name was taken from a nearby hill "Kutta kutta", which was the local Aboriginal name for the night hawk.

A school was built in the town in 1920, remaining active for 25 years before closing in 1945.

English-born scientist and museum curator Robert Bedford (born Robert Arthur Buddicom; 1874–1951) constructed an aerodrome at Kyancutta and established the short-lived Eyre Peninsula Airways in 1929, and flights between Adelaide and Perth stopped there regularly. This added another facet to the town's economy, and the town fell into a steady decline after its closure in 1935. In his later life, he became obsessed with trying to reconstruct the airport.

Also due to Bedford's efforts, after he had been sending accurate weather reports on the area to Adelaide, an official weather station was established at Kyancutta in 1928. It became Australia's first fully-automated station with a three-hourly programme of weather observation, which is still ongoing under the care of the Australian Bureau of Meteorology.

In 1929 Bedford established Kyancutta Museum and Library, in which he housed his extensive collection of fossils, minerals, and artefacts, some collected in the UK and many others from various parts of South Australia. These included archaeocyaths (a type of marine sponge of the Cambrian era) and related fossils from the Ajax Mine near Beltana in the Flinders Ranges, as well as meteorite fragments. The museum remained open to the public until 1971, after which the collections were sold, the meteorites to the Australian National University and most of the rest to the National Museum of Victoria in Melbourne.

On 29 March 1986, Polkdinney Park was opened as a Jubilee 150 project, as a memorial park to honour the pioneers of agricultural settlement in the area.

== Description ==
The town was described in 2004 as a "tiny wheatbelt town at the northern extremity of the Eyre Peninsula... notable only for its wheat silo and its position as the point where Highway One heads south to Port Lincoln ... now very close to being a ghost town, sustained only by the passing motorists and the local wheat and sheep farmers".

Kyancutta Store was closed as of January 2021.

The town is the service centre for the surrounding agricultural districts, with cereal crops and sheep grazing the prevalent industries. Grain silos for storage of wheat and field peas are located in Kyancutta at the railway station on the Eyre Peninsula Railway to Port Lincoln.

== Facilities and tourism ==
Kyancutta serves as a rest point for travellers making their way across the Eyre Highway. A number of natural features, including Waddikee Rock and Corrobinne Hill, lie within 20 km (12 mi) of the town.

Tourist attractions include:

- Polkdinney Park, which includes picnic facilities, public toilets, and examples of early machinery such as a scrub roller, water pump, wagon, road grader, and Mouldboard plough.
- Monument to John Darke, surveyor and an explorer; located 32 km (20 mi) east of Kyancutta on the road to Kimba, at Koongawa. John Charles Darke died after being wounded by spears by local Aboriginal people on 24 October 1844, and gave his name to another small agricultural town, Darke Peak (formerly Darke's Peak).

== Climate ==
Kyancutta has a semi-arid climate (Köppen: BSk), with moderately hot, dry summers, and mild, relatively wet winters. Due to its inland location, average minima remain cool to cold year-round, range 4.8 °C (40.6 °F) in July to 14.5 °C (58.1 °F) in January and February. Average annual rainfall is low: 310.7 mm (12.23 in), occurring within 95.5 rainfall days, with a maximum in winter. Extreme temperatures have ranged from −7.0 °C (19.4 °F) on 9 July 1959 to 49.3 °C (120.7 °F) on 9 January 1939.

Climate data for Kyancutta (33º07'48"S, 135º33'00"E, 59 m AMSL) (1930-2024 normals and extremes)
Month	Jan	Feb	Mar	Apr	May	Jun	Jul	Aug	Sep	Oct	Nov	Dec	Year
Record high °C (°F)	49.3 (120.7)	46.8 (116.2)	46.1 (115.0)	41.1 (106.0)	33.1 (91.6)	28.4 (83.1)	30.0 (86.0)	33.2 (91.8)	37.9 (100.2)	43.0 (109.4)	46.1 (115.0)	48.0 (118.4)	49.3 (120.7)
Mean daily maximum °C (°F)	33.1 (91.6)	32.5 (90.5)	29.9 (85.8)	25.4 (77.7)	21.1 (70.0)	17.8 (64.0)	17.2 (63.0)	18.7 (65.7)	22.0 (71.6)	25.4 (77.7)	28.7 (83.7)	31.0 (87.8)	25.2 (77.4)
Mean daily minimum °C (°F)	14.5 (58.1)	14.5 (58.1)	12.4 (54.3)	9.5 (49.1)	7.3 (45.1)	5.4 (41.7)	4.8 (40.6)	4.9 (40.8)	6.3 (43.3)	8.3 (46.9)	10.9 (51.6)	13.0 (55.4)	9.3 (48.8)
Record low °C (°F)	4.0 (39.2)	4.1 (39.4)	1.7 (35.1)	−1.1 (30.0)	−3.2 (26.2)	−6.3 (20.7)	−7.0 (19.4)	−4.7 (23.5)	−3.7 (25.3)	−2.2 (28.0)	0.1 (32.2)	2.2 (36.0)	−7.0 (19.4)
Average precipitation mm (inches)	14.9 (0.59)	15.9 (0.63)	13.8 (0.54)	19.4 (0.76)	31.3 (1.23)	38.3 (1.51)	39.2 (1.54)	38.8 (1.53)	30.8 (1.21)	25.5 (1.00)	22.3 (0.88)	20.6 (0.81)	310.7 (12.23)
Average precipitation days (≥ 0.2 mm)	3.6	3.3	3.8	6.4	10.3	12.0	13.5	13.6	9.8	8.1	6.0	5.1	95.5
Average afternoon relative humidity (%)	28	30	33	40	50	56	57	51	43	36	31	30	40
Average dew point °C (°F)	8.8 (47.8)	9.8 (49.6)	9.1 (48.4)	8.2 (46.8)	8.0 (46.4)	7.2 (45.0)	6.7 (44.1)	6.0 (42.8)	6.0 (42.8)	5.8 (42.4)	6.5 (43.7)	8.0 (46.4)	7.5 (45.5)
Mean monthly sunshine hours	306.9	254.3	247.0	192.0	167.4	153.0	158.1	179.8	186.0	232.5	261.0	282.1	2,620.1
Percentage possible sunshine	70	68	65	57	52	51	50	53	52	58	63	64	59
Source: Bureau of Meteorology (1930-2024 normals and extremes)
