= Archibald Lucius Douglas =

Canadian officer of the British Navy

Admiral Sir Archibald Douglas GCB GCVO
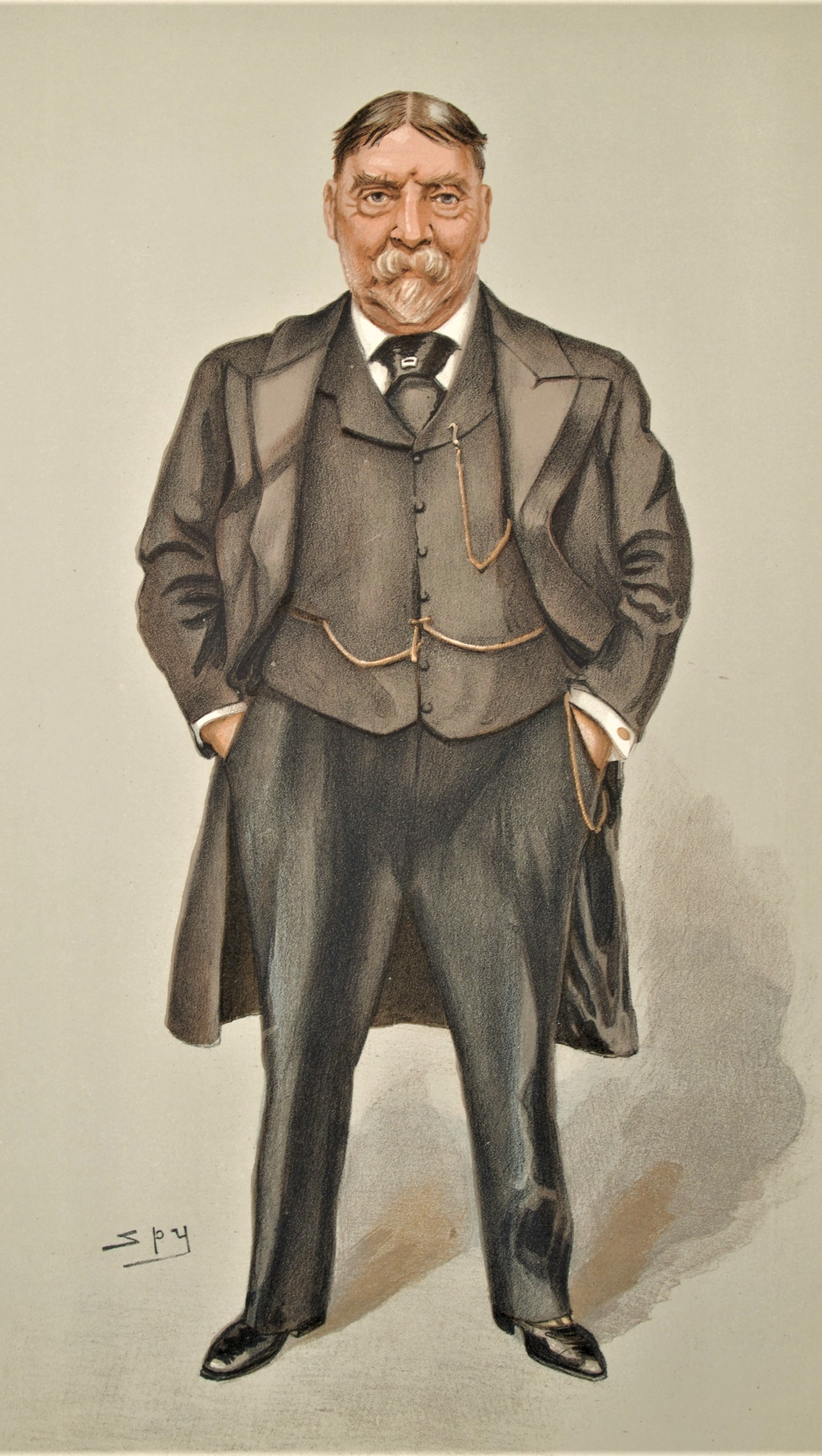
- "North America and West Indies" as caricatured by "Spy" (Leslie Ward) in Vanity Fair, July 1902
- Born: 8 February 1842; Quebec City, Quebec, Canada
- Died: 12 March 1913 (aged 71); Newnham, Hampshire, England
- Military career
- Allegiance: United Kingdom
- Branch: Royal Navy
- Service years: 1856–1907
- Rank: Admiral
- Conflicts: Fenian Raids; Russo-Turkish War; Anglo-Egyptian War
- Awards: Knight Grand Cross of the Order of the Bath; Knight Grand Cross of the Royal Victorian Order

Admiral Sir Archibald Lucius Douglas, GCB, GCVO (8 February 1842 – 12 March 1913) was a Royal Navy officer of the 19th century.

== Naval career ==
Douglas was born in Quebec City in pre-Confederation Canada in 1842. Educated at the Quebec High School, he joined the Royal Navy as a cadet in 1856.

He served as a Gunnery Lieutenant on HMS Aurora during the Fenian Raids in 1866.

He was selected to head the second British naval mission to Japan in 1873, and served as a foreign advisor to the fledgling Imperial Japanese Navy until 1875.

Douglas was based at the Imperial Japanese Navy Academy, then located at Tsukiji in Tokyo, where he trained a class of 30 officers. During his tenure, his advice was called upon for the Taiwan Expedition of 1874, the first major overseas deployment for the Japanese navy.

During his stay in Japan, he is also credited with having introduced the sport of football to Japanese naval cadets.

During the Russo-Turkish War of 1877–1878, Douglas commanded HMS Egeria on an intelligence gathering mission to Petropavlovsk in Kamchatka, which he found to have been abandoned by its Russian garrison.

Douglas was appointed Commander-in-Chief, East Indies Station in 1898 and Second Naval Lord in 1899. He was promoted to the rank of vice admiral on 15 June 1901, In June 1902 he was appointed Commander-in-chief of the North America and West Indies Station, and he arrived in Halifax to take up the position on 15 July with his flagship, the cruiser HMS Ariadne. Aboard HMS Ariadne Douglas took part as commander of combined fleet in the naval blockade of Venezuelan ports during the Venezuelan crisis of 1902–1903. He went on to be Commander-in-Chief, Portsmouth in 1904 and retired from the service in 1907.

In 1910 he was made an honorary LL.D. of McGill University; in 1902 he was created a KCB, in 1905 a GCVO, and in 1911 a GCB.

Douglas died in Hampshire, England in 1913.

== Family ==
His brother was Campbell Mellis Douglas, who was awarded the Victoria Cross in 1867.

Douglas married, in 1871, Constance Ellen Hawks, daughter of Rev. William Hawks. Mrs. Douglas (as she was known then) was godmother to HMS Lancaster in March 1902.
One of their sons Lt.-Cdr. David William Shafto Douglas R.N. (1883-1916) was KIA when his ship HMS Black Prince (1904) was lost with all hands at the battle of Jutland.

== Bibliography ==
- Douglas, Archibald C. Life of Admiral Sir Archibald Lucius Douglas, G.C.B, G.C.V.O, Commander of the Legion of Honour, Order of the Rising Sun of Japan, Spanish Naval Order of Merit, by his son. Mortimer Bros (1938) ASIN B001CO3IT8

Military offices
Preceded by Edmund Drummond	Commander-in-Chief, East Indies Station; 1898–1899	Succeeded by Sir Day Bosanquet
Preceded by Lord Walter Kerr	Second Naval Lord; 1899–1902	Succeeded by Sir John Fisher
Preceded by Sir Frederick Bedford	Commander-in-Chief, North America and West Indies Station; 1902–1904	Succeeded by Sir Day Bosanquet
Preceded by Sir John Fisher	Commander-in-Chief, Portsmouth; 1905–1907	Succeeded by Sir Day Bosanquet
