= Old Eyre Highway =

Former highway route in South Australia

Old Eyre Highway is a remnant part of the Eyre Highway that was abandoned in the construction of a route closer to the coast of the Great Australian Bight.

It has been known as the East West Road, and briefly in the 1940s as Forrest Highway. Portions of the old route now exist in a range of protected areas, Aboriginal lands, and National Parks and reserves on the South Australian side. Permits to access are required from Yalata, as well as SA National Parks for camping and access.

The sandy track and numerous cattle grids were experienced by traffic well into the late 1970s when the SA route was sealed and moved south.

The route can be seen in most online maps as being between Yalata, South Australia and Eucla, Western Australia.

== Tanks ==
During the survey and construction of the Trans-Australian Railway, and after into the stages of working on the Eyre Highway, locations for water on the Nullarbor and vicinity of the Eyre highway were given a range of names:

- Rain sheds and rain tanks - there was reference to locations as early as 1894
- Transported water by train or truck
- Underground water tanks
- Watering stations
- Water catchment

Existence of wells and springs across the area has been documented, with the water ranging from drinkable to undrinkable. At various stages in time, water rationing was required as travellers would seek water from stations on the route.

== Named locations ==
Some of the named features on the route include:

- Ivy Tanks - an abandoned locality in South Australia. Ivy Tanks was regularly identified in stories in the Walkabout magazine in the 1960s. It was also the location of a repeater station for the Australian telecommunication network. The locality is designated a postcode despite lack of habitation.
- Mallabie Tank
- No 2 Tank
- Gundalabbie Tank
- Yanganoobie Tank
- Koonalda Homestead
- Coompana Tank
- Bunabie Tank

There were also a series of tracks linking the highway with locations on the Trans-Australian Railway to the north.

== See also ==
- Nullarbor Regional Reserve
- Nullarbor National Park
- Nullarbor Wilderness Protection Area
