= Yaninee, South Australia =

Yaninee
- Town
- Coordinates: 32°57′0″S 135°16′0″E
- Country: Australia
- State: South Australia
- Region: Eyre Western
- LGA: Wudinna District Council
- Location: 584 km (363 mi) NW of Adelaide; 266 km (165 mi) W of Whyalla; 21 km (13 mi) W of Wudinna

Government
  - State electorate: Flinders
  - Federal division: Grey

Population
  - Total: 66 (2021 census)
- Postcode: 5653
- County: Le Hunte

Yaninee is a small town situated on the Eyre Highway in central Eyre Peninsula, South Australia, 21 kilometres (13 mi) west of Wudinna. At the 2021 census, Yaninee and the surrounding area had a population of 66.

Established in the late 19th century, Yaninee was once a thriving town servicing the local farming community. Some of the original farming families were the Bubners and the Scholzs. The General Store, now closed, was operated by N.F. and D.T. McEvoy and Mrs Schacke in the 1950s, Ray and Grace Wickes in the 1960s. The Lutheran church still stands as do the netball and tennis courts and the football oval still hosts regional games. A photograph of the 1935 premiership ladies' tennis team was in the Adelaide newspaper, The Chronicle on 4 July 1935.

== Name ==
A corruption of the Aboriginal janani – 'to go, walk or travel' and given to the 'Lake Yaninee Run', established by A. Baird in 1865 (lease no. 1204).

== History ==
The Hundred of Yaninee, County of Le Hunte, was proclaimed on 31 July 1913 and the town of Yaninee, 20 km north-West of Wudinna, on 23 March 1916.

The Yaninee Post Office was opened by J.J. McCarthy on 6 March 1918; the Yaninee School opened in 1919 and closed in 1945.

In 1926, it was said that it was a 'go-ahead settlement with its store, garage, wheat sheds and other buildings': A fine hall has just been completed. The surrounding country is mainly devoted to wheat and sheep farming. Last season 50,000 bags of wheat were delivered at the siding… A telegraph line is being constructed along the railway line from Port Lincoln to Thevenard…
