= Eyre (given name) =

Eyre is a given name. Notable people with the name include:

- Eyre Coote (East India Company officer) (1726–1783), Irish soldier
- Eyre Coote (British Army officer) (1760–1823), Irish soldier, nephew of the above
- Eyre Crowe (1864-1925), British diplomat
- Eyre Crowe (painter) (1824-1910), British author and painter
- Eyre Evans Crowe (1799-1868), British journalist and historian
- Eyre Massey Shaw (1830-1908), Superintendent of London Fire Brigade
