= Eyre Creek =

Eyre Creek may refer to:

- Eyre Creek (Lake Eyre basin), part of the Lake Eyre basin and located in Queensland and South Australia
- Eyre Creek (New Zealand)
- Eyre Creek (locality), New Zealand
- Eyre Creek (Ontario), a tributary of Redstone River (Haliburton County, Ontario)
- Eyre Creek (South Australia), a tributary of the Wakefield River

== See also ==
- Eyre River (disambiguation)
