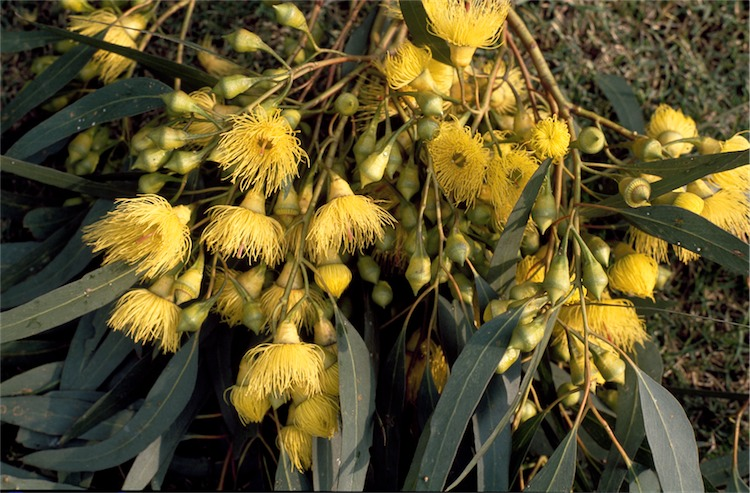
- Flower buds and yellow flowers of Eucalyptus petiolaris

Conservation status
- Endangered (IUCN 3.1)

Scientific classification
- Kingdom: Plantae
- Clade: Tracheophytes
- Clade: Angiosperms
- Clade: Eudicots
- Clade: Rosids
- Order: Myrtales
- Family: Myrtaceae
- Genus: Eucalyptus
- Species: E. petiolaris

Binomial name
- Eucalyptus petiolaris (Boland) Rule

Synonyms
- Eucalyptus leucoxylon subsp. petiolaris Boland

= Eucalyptus petiolaris =

Eyre Peninsula blue gum

Species of plant

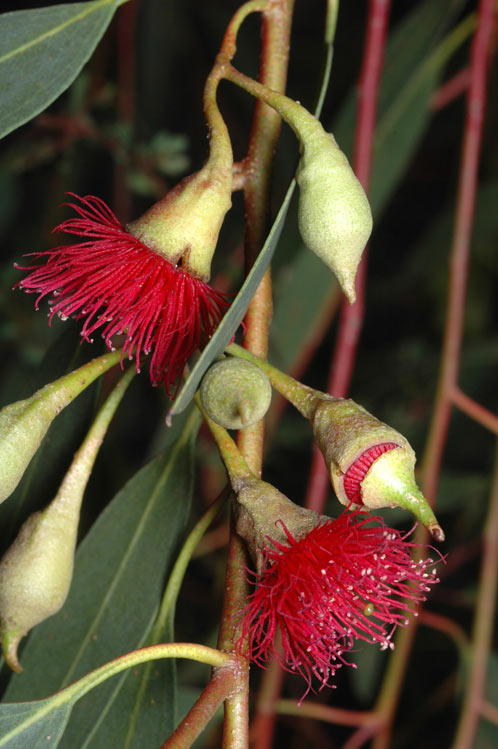
Red-flowered form

Eucalyptus petiolaris, commonly known as Eyre Peninsula blue gum, water gum or blue gum, is a species of small to medium-sized tree that is endemic to South Australia. It is also naturalised in Western Australia. It has rough, flaky bark on the trunk, smooth greyish bark above, lance-shaped adult leaves, flower buds in groups of three, cream-coloured, yellow, pink or red flowers and cup-shaped or barrel-shaped fruit.

== Description ==
Eucalyptus petiolaris is a tree that typically grows to a height of 15–20 m (49–66 ft) and forms a lignotuber. It has rough, flaky bark on part or all of the trunk, smooth greyish and yellowish bark above. Young plants and coppice regrowth have dull greyish green, egg-shaped leaves that are 60–90 mm (2.4–3.5 in) long and 38–68 mm (1.5–2.7 in) wide. Adult leaves are the same shade of green on both sides, lance-shaped or curved, 85–150 mm (3.3–5.9 in) long and 12–25 mm (0.47–0.98 in) wide tapering to a petiole 12–27 mm (0.47–1.06 in) long. The flower buds are arranged in leaf axils in groups of three on an unbranched, pendent peduncle 9–22 mm (0.35–0.87 in) long, the individual buds on pedicels 6–17 mm (0.24–0.67 in) long. Mature buds are oval to cylindrical, 11–17 mm (0.43–0.67 in) long and 7–10 mm (0.28–0.39 in) wide with a conical to slightly beaked operculum. Flowering occurs from August to January and the flowers are cream-coloured to yellow or pink to brilliant red. The fruit is a woody, cup-shaped or barrel-shaped capsule 11–17 mm (0.43–0.67 in) long and 10–15 mm (0.39–0.59 in) wide with the valves enclosed below the rim.

== Taxonomy ==
Eyre Peninsula blue gum was first formally described in 1979 by Douglas John Boland who gave it the name Eucalyptus leucoxylon subsp. petiolaris. The description was published in Australian Forest Research from material he collected near Pillaworta Creek in 1971. In 1992, Kevin James Rule raised the subspecies to species status as E. petiolaris. The specific epithet (petiolaris) is from Latin, meaning "having a petiole".

== Distribution and habitat ==
Eucalyptus petiolaris grows in remnants on farms, roadsides and a few flora reserves in hilly or undulating terrain near Port Lincoln and near Cleve. It has also been naturalised in a few coastal area in Western Australia.

== See also ==
- List of Eucalyptus species
