= Eyre River (Western Australia) =

River in Western Australia

Coordinates: 34°35′25″S 118°42′41″E

Location
- Country: Australia

Physical characteristics
- Source
  - location: Blackboy Hill
  - elevation: 107 metres (351 ft)
- Mouth
  - location: Cheynes Inlet
  - elevation: sea level
- Length: 11 km (6.8 mi)

The Eyre River is a river in the Great Southern region of Western Australia. The headwaters of the river rise below Blackboy Hill approximately 7 kilometres (4 mi) south of Wellstead. The river flows in a south-easterly direction and discharges into Cheynes Inlet and on to the Southern Ocean.

The river was named in 1850 by the explorer Francis Thomas Gregory after the explorer John Eyre, who crossed it in 1841 on his expedition from Adelaide to Albany.
