= Wudinna District Council =

Coordinates: 33.047°S 135.46°E

- Local government area
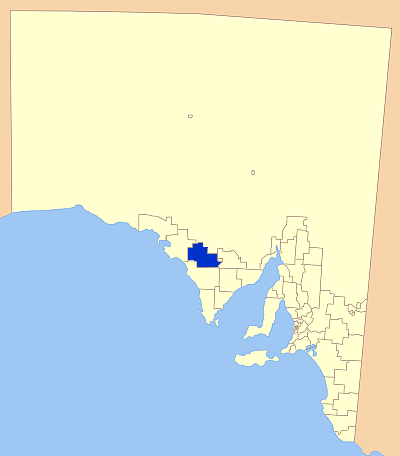
- Location of the Wudinna District Council (formerly Le Hunte)

- Interactive map of Wudinna District Council
- Country: Australia
- State: South Australia
- Region: Eyre Western
- Established: 1925
- Council seat: Wudinna

Government
  - Mayor: Eleanor Scholz
  - State electorate: Flinders
  - Federal division: Grey

Area
  - Total: 5,393.8 km^{2} (2,082.6 sq mi)

Population
  - Total: 1,136 (LGA 2021)
- Website: Wudinna District Council
LGAs around Wudinna District Council
	Outback Communities Authority
District Council of Streaky Bay	Wudinna District Council	District Council of Kimba
	District Council of Elliston	District Council of Cleve

Wudinna District Council is a rural local government area on central Eyre Peninsula, South Australia. Its seat is Wudinna, on the Eyre Highway, 580 kilometres (360 mi) west of Adelaide. The district's economy is largely driven by agriculture, mainly cereal crops, with beef and sheep commonly farmed as well.

== History ==
The original corporate entity for Wudinna district was the District Council of Minnipa, which was established on 28 May 1925. Its boundaries were defined as including the hundreds of Minnipa, Yaninee, Pygery, Wudinna, Palabie, Wannamana, Mamblin, Warramboo, Kappakoola, Pordia and Cocata in the County of Le Hunte, and the hundreds of Condada, Moorkitabie, Carina, Addison and Travers in the County of Robinson, the latter five hundreds being annexed from the District Council of Streaky Bay. The inaugural councillors appointed were Charles James Rowen, Arthur William Christian, William Mitchell, Thomas Knight, Edwin James Turley, Ellery John Drummond Oswald, and Edward Beck Smith.

It was renamed the District Council of Le Hunte in 1932, after Sir George Ruthven Le Hunte, who as Governor of South Australia had proclaimed the County of Le Hunte in 1908.

It was again renamed on 24 April 2008 as Wudinna District Council.

== Localities ==
The district encompasses a number of towns and localities, including Cocata, Koongawa, Kyancutta, Minnipa, Pygery, Warramboo, Wudinna and Yaninee, Karcultaby, Mount Damper and Pinkawillinie. The former locality of Paney, which was a small portion of the present bounded locality of Gawler Ranges, is also in Wudinna council area. Paney was merged into the Gawler Ranges locality when the latter's boundaries were formalised in April 2013.

== Facilities ==
The area has a number of sporting facilities with football, cricket, tennis and bowls all popular pastimes. Swimming pools are also located at Wudinna and Minnipa. The district also has a number of schools and a hospital.

== Elected members ==
Ward	Councillor	Notes
Unsubdivided	Richard DuBois	
Unsubdivided	Tony Griffin	
Unsubdivided	Newton (Ned) Luscombe	Deputy Mayor
Unsubdivided	Jill Rushmer	
Unsubdivided	Eleanor Scholz	Mayor
Unsubdivided	Naomi Scholz	
Unsubdivided	Craig Walladge	

== Mayors and chairmen of the District Council of Le Hunte/Wudinna ==
- Ernest Harry Edmonds (1931–1939)
- Alfred William Hurtle Barns (1939–1941)
- Ernest Harry Edmonds (1941–1944)
- David Trevenen Sampson (1944–1946)
- Philip Warburton Symonds (1946–1947)
- Harold Edward Broad (1947–1950)
- Oswald John Murphy (1950–1951)
- Victor Melrose Karger (1951–1952)
- William Maxwell Heath (1952–1958)
- Percy Archibald Tonkin (1958–1959)
- George Harnet Phillips (1959–1965)
- William Leonard Wilkins (1965–1976)
- Eric Markey (1976–1977)
- Murray Murvin Gerschwitz (1977–1979)
- Newton Lloyd Simpson (1979–1982)
- Murray Murvin Gerschwitz (1982–1987)
- Tim Scholz (2003–2013)
- Eleanor Scholz (2013–present)
