= Eyre Highway =

Highway in South Australia and Western Australia

Eyre Highway Western Australia–South Australia
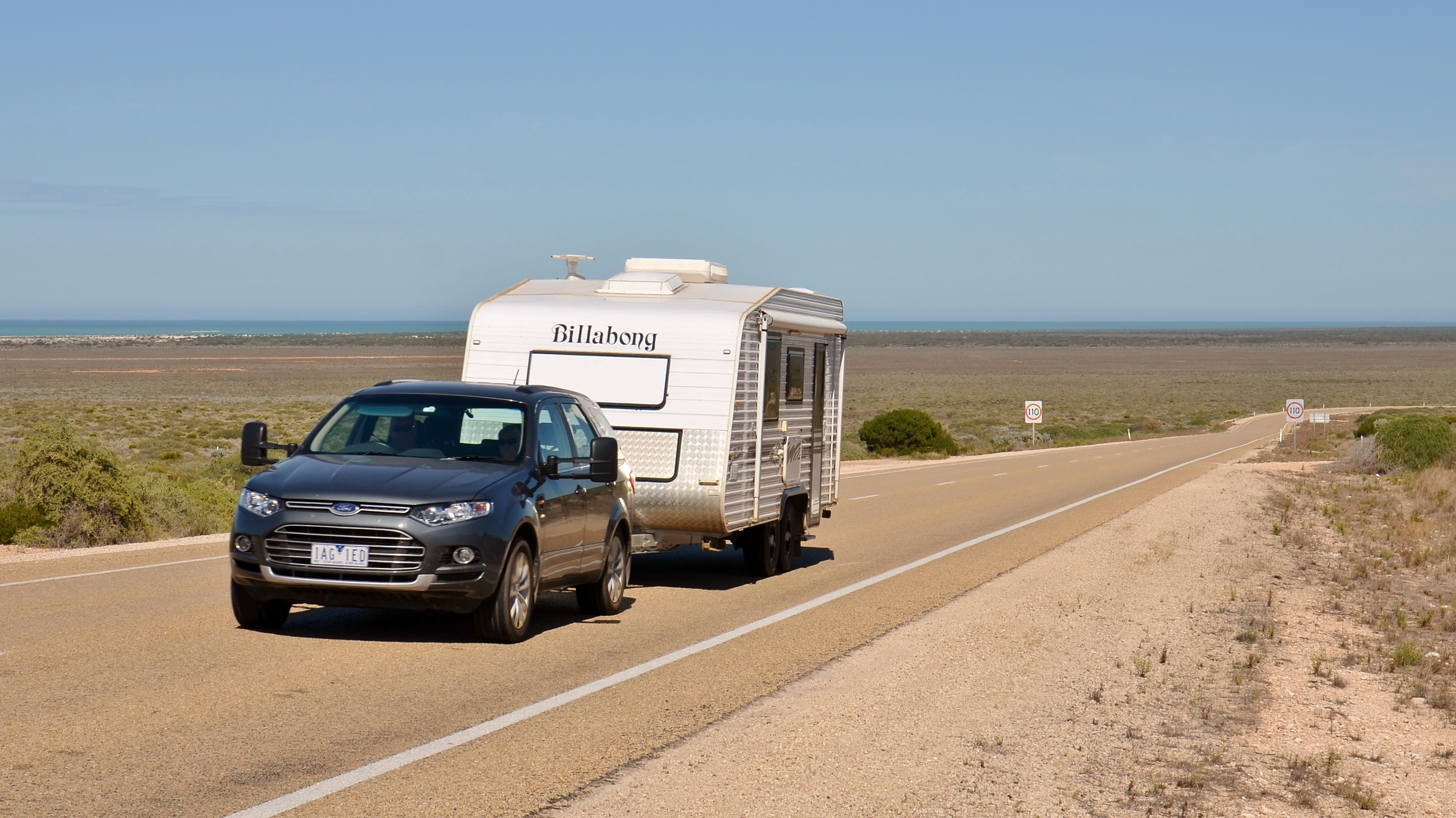
- The Eyre Highway at Eucla Pass
- Map of South Australia and southern Western Australia with Eyre Highway highlighted in red

General information
- Type: Highway
- Length: 1,664 km (1,034 mi)
- Opened: 1942
- Route number(s): National Highway 1 (1974–present) (Western Australia); A1 (2017–present) (South Australia)
- Former route number: National Highway A1 (1998–2017); National Highway 1 (1974–1998) (South Australia); National Route 1 (1955–1974) Entire route

Major junctions
- West end: Coolgardie–Esperance Highway; Norseman, Western Australia
- Flinders Highway; Tod Highway; Lincoln Highway; Stuart Highway
- East end: Augusta Highway; Port Augusta, South Australia

Location(s)
- Major settlements: Eucla, Ceduna, Kyancutta, Kimba

Highway system
- Highways in Australia; National Highway • Freeways in Australia; Highways in Western Australia; Highways in South Australia

Eyre Highway is a 1,664-kilometre (1,034 mi) highway linking Western Australia and South Australia via the Nullarbor Plain. Signed as National Highways 1 and A1, it forms part of Highway 1 and the Australian National Highway network linking Perth and Adelaide. It was named after explorer Edward John Eyre, who was the first European to cross the Nullarbor by land, in 1840–1841. Eyre Highway runs from Norseman in Western Australia, past Eucla, to the state border. Continuing to the South Australian town of Ceduna, it crosses the top of the Eyre Peninsula before reaching Port Augusta.

The construction of the East–West Telegraph line in the 1870s, along Eyre's route, resulted in a hazardous trail that could be followed for interstate travel. A national highway was called for, with the federal government seeing the route's importance in 1941, when a war in the Pacific seemed imminent. The highway was constructed between July 1941 and June 1942, and was trafficable by January 1942. Originally it was named Forrest Highway, after John Forrest, by the war cabinet. It was officially renamed Eyre Highway in 1943, a name agreed upon by the states' nomenclature committees.

The finished road, while an improvement over the previous route, still was not much more than a track, and remained such throughout the 1940s and 1950s. Efforts to seal the highway began in Norseman in 1960, with the Western Australian section completed in 1969 and the South Australian section finished in 1976. Further improvement works have been undertaken since the 1980s, including widening and reconstructing portions of the road.

== Route description ==
Eyre Highway is the only sealed road linking the states of Western Australia and South Australia. It is one of Western Australia's two sealed interstate roads, the other being the Victoria Highway linking Western Australia and Northern Territory. Eyre Highway runs east from Norseman in Western Australia for 1,200 kilometres (750 mi) across the Nullarbor Plain to Ceduna, South Australia. It crosses the top of the Eyre Peninsula as it continues eastwards for 470 kilometres (290 mi), before reaching Port Augusta.

Eyre Highway is part of the National Highway route between Perth and Adelaide, and forms part of Australia's Highway 1. It is signed as National Highway 1 in Western Australia, and National Highway A1 in South Australia. The vast majority of the highway is a two-lane single carriageway with a speed limit of 110 kilometres per hour (68 mph), except in and around built-up areas. Road trains (A-double or B-triple) up to 42.5 metres (139 ft) are permitted on the Eyre Highway, with Quads up to 49.5 metres (163 feet) between Ceduna and Colona Station turnoff limited to 100 kilometres per hour (62 mph).

The Western Australian section of Eyre Highway is on the western side of the Nullarbor Plain. The South Australian section crosses the eastern section of the Nullarbor Plain, and the top of the Eyre Peninsula. The Nullarbor gets its name from Latin for "no tree". The typical view on the route is a straight highway and practically unchanging flat saltbush-covered terrain. The Eyre Peninsula has been extensively cleared for agriculture, although there are remnant corridors of native eucalyptus woodland alongside its roads.

Main Roads Western Australia and the Department for Infrastructure & Transport in South Australia monitor traffic volume across the states' road networks, including various locations along Eyre Highway. In Western Australia, the recorded traffic volumes ranged between 430 and 760 vehicles per day in 2013/14. In South Australia, the estimated annual average daily traffic as of September 2015 varied between 500 and 1,500 vehicles west of Lincoln Highway, and was 2,700 to the east.

=== Safety ===
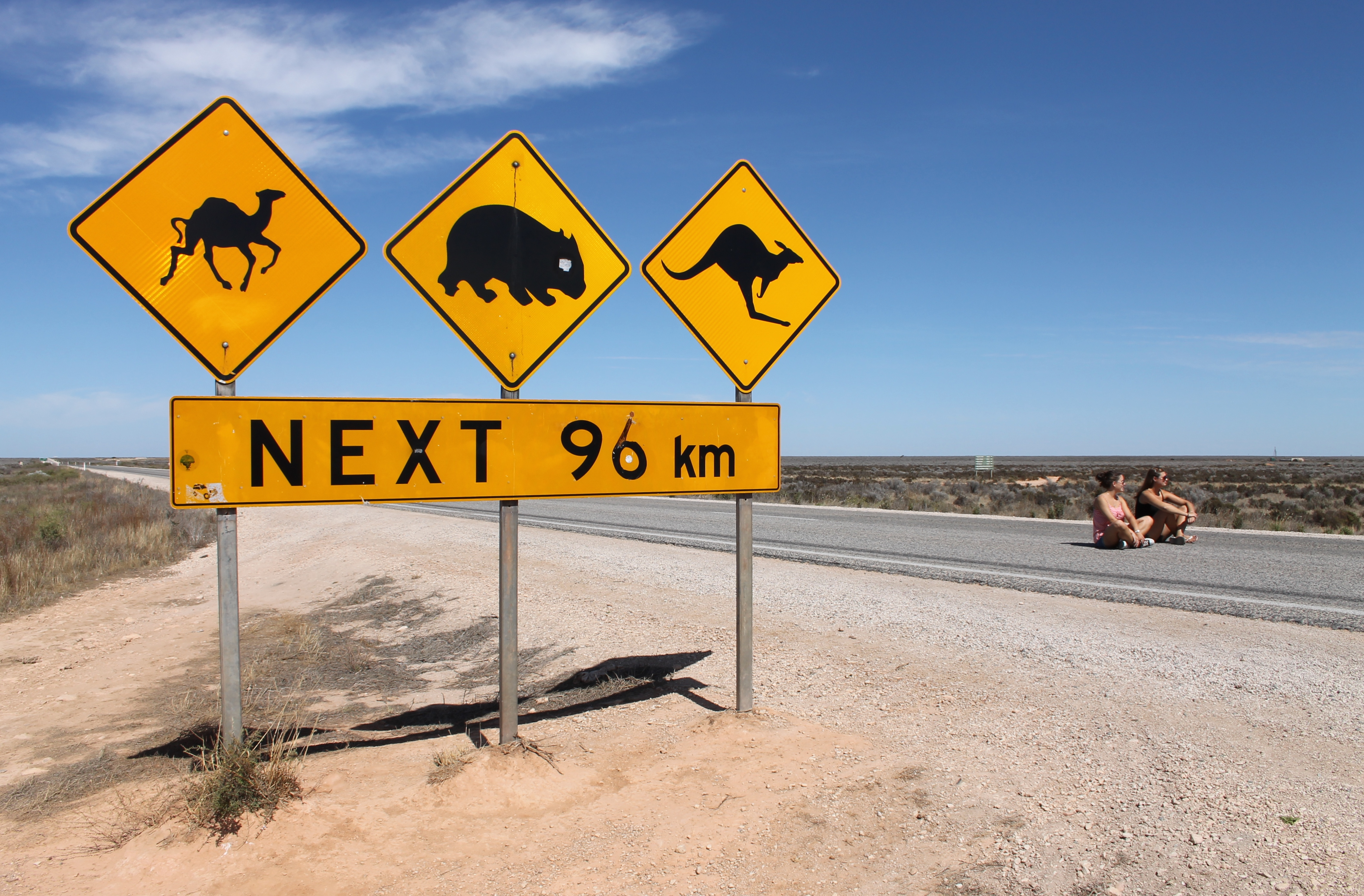
The Eyre Highway crosses the flat terrain of the Nullarbor Plain.

In 2011, the Australian Automobile Association considered the Eyre Highway to be among the lowest risk highways in the country, based on total number of casualty crashes (Note: The Australian Automobile Association's How Safe are our Roads? Rating Australia's National Network for Risk report defines a casualty crash as "any road crash in which at least one person is killed or injured and this includes serious injuries which typically represent one third of casualty crashes".) per length of road. The individual risk based on casualty crash rates per vehicle kilometre travelled was assessed as high for the 95 km section east of Yalata to Fowlers Bay. It was medium for a 106-kilometre (66 mi) section from Fowlers Bay to Ceduna, low-medium between Ceduna and Port Augusta, and low west of Yalata.

In 2013, Eyre Highway similarly received a lower safety rating for the South Australian sections, compared to the Western Australian section. Out of five stars, approximately 10% was rated as one- or two-star in Western Australia, generally towards the Norseman end, and 91% was rated three- or four-star. In South Australia, 49% was rated as one- or two-star, mostly from Yalata to Ceduna, and across the Eyre Peninsula, with the remaining 51% rated as three- or four-star.

=== Western Australia ===
Eyre Highway begins at the town of Norseman, on the Coolgardie–Esperance Highway. Apart from Eucla, 12 kilometres (7.5 mi) from the South Australia border, roadhouses serving the highway are the only settlements on the 720-kilometre-long (450 mi) stretch through Western Australia. These are located 65 to 180 kilometres (40 to 110 mi) apart, at Balladonia, Caiguna, Cocklebiddy, Madura, and Mundrabilla.

Australia's longest straight stretch of road. Known as 90 mile straight, it is 146.6km without a bend. This timelapse video vehicle's speed was 110km driving east starting at sunset.

The section between Balladonia and Caiguna includes what is regarded as the longest straight stretch of road in Australia and one of the longest in the world. The road stretches for 146.6 kilometres (91.1 mi) without turning, and is signposted and commonly known as the "90 Mile Straight". Travelling east, the highway descends through the Madura Pass just before the Madura roadhouse from the Nullarbor Plain to the coastal Roe Plains. It skirts the bottom of the escarpment, climbing back through the Eucla Pass just before Eucla.

Because of its remoteness, some widened sections of the highway serve as emergency airstrips for the Royal Flying Doctor Service. These airstrips are signposted, have runway pavement markings painted on the road, and turnaround bays for small aircraft.

=== South Australia ===
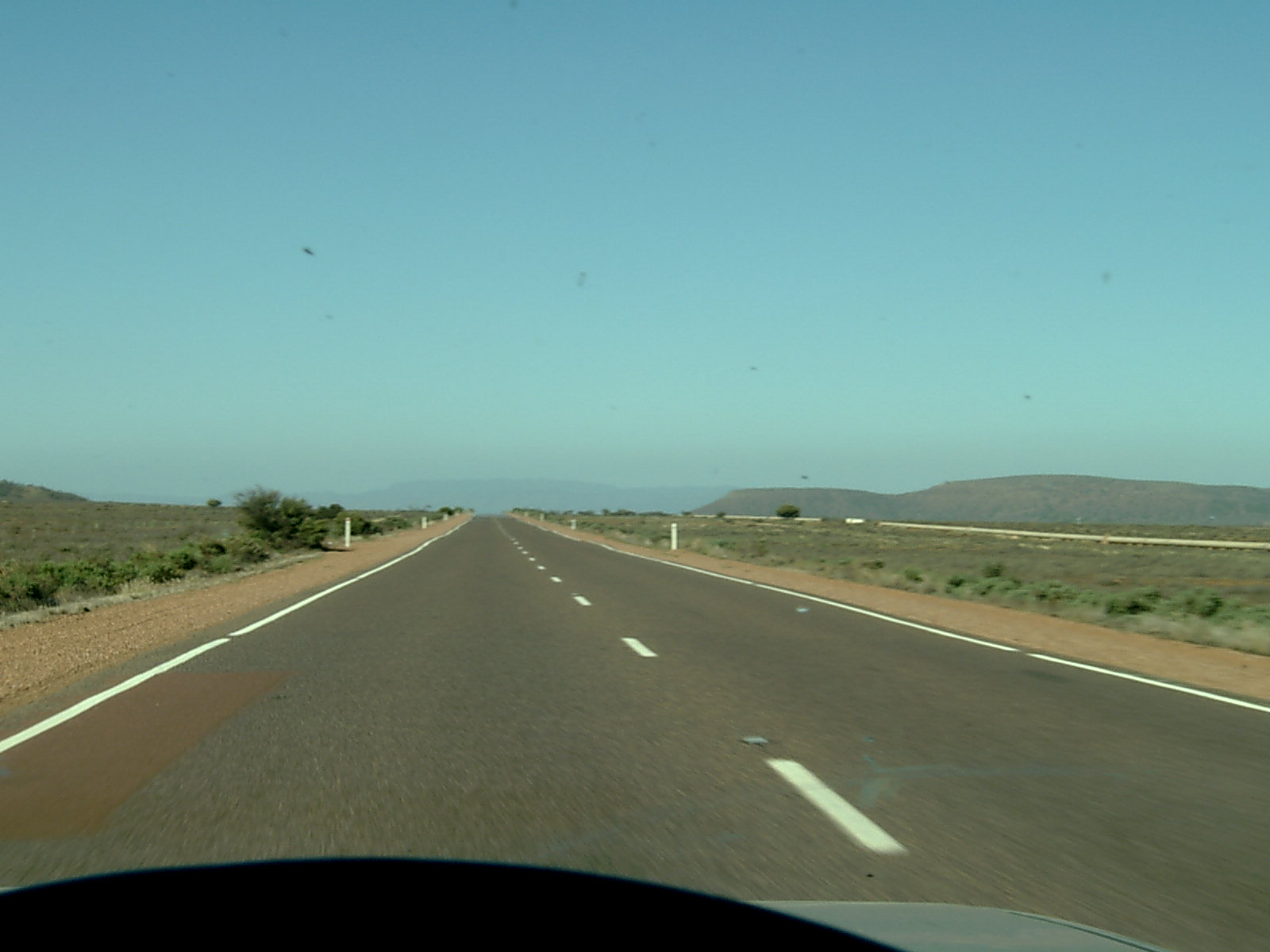
Driving north along the Eyre Highway between Iron Knob and Port Augusta

After crossing the border at the settlement of Border Village, the highway passes through the Nullarbor Wilderness Protection Area and through the localities of Yalata, Penong and Ceduna. Before arriving at Ceduna, it enters the Eyre Peninsula. After Ceduna, the highway passes the intersection with Flinders Highway and heads south-east towards Kyancutta. After passing through Wirrulla, Poochera, Yanninee and Wudinna, the highway arrives at Kyancutta where it meets the north end of the Tod Highway.

After Kyancutta, the highway turns to the east towards the town of Kimba. Before arriving at Kimba, it turns to the north-east. After Kimba, the highway passes through the southern end of the Lake Gilles Conservation Park and to the immediate north of both the town of Iron Knob and the Cultana Training Area before meeting the Lincoln Highway. It continues north-east until it intersects with the Augusta Highway and Stuart Highway, north-west of the Joy Baluch AM Bridge which crosses Spencer Gulf at Port Augusta.

An alternative route between Ceduna and Port Augusta, formerly signed Alternate National Route 1 and now signed B100, follows Flinders Highway and Lincoln Highway down the western and eastern sides of the peninsula respectively.

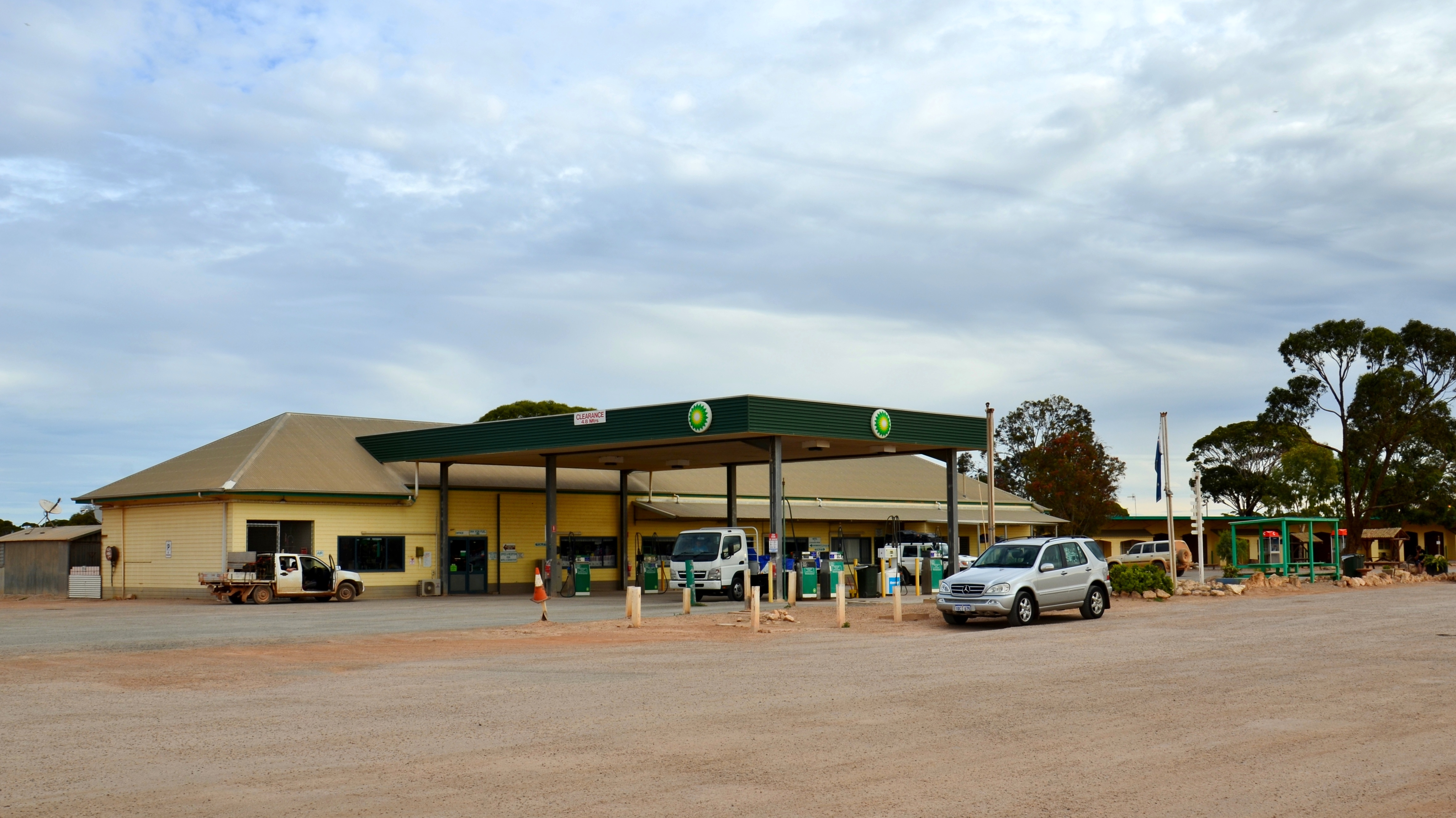
Caiguna Roadhouse, a typical Nullarbor roadhouse

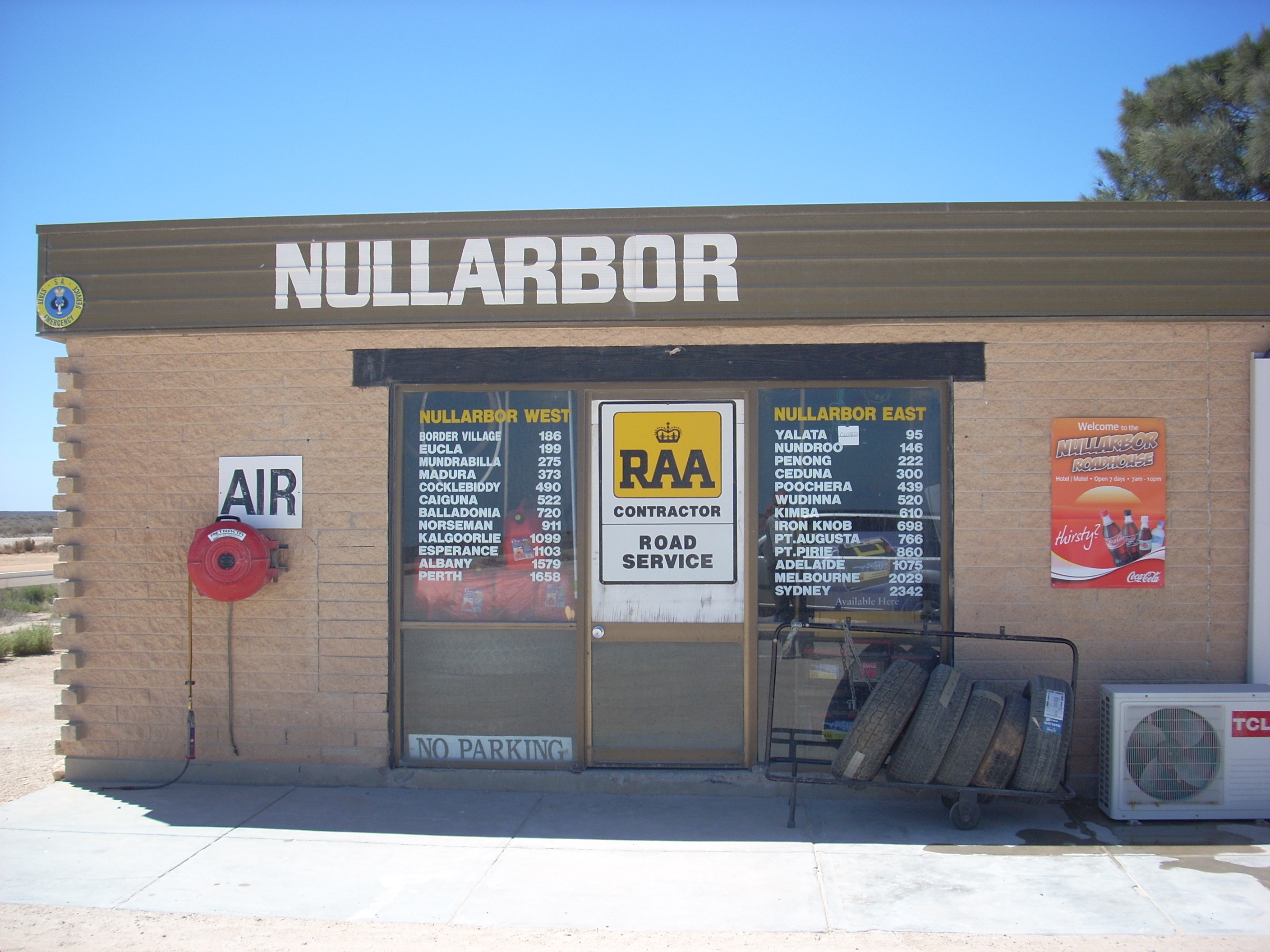
Nullarbor roadhouse distances sign in 2008

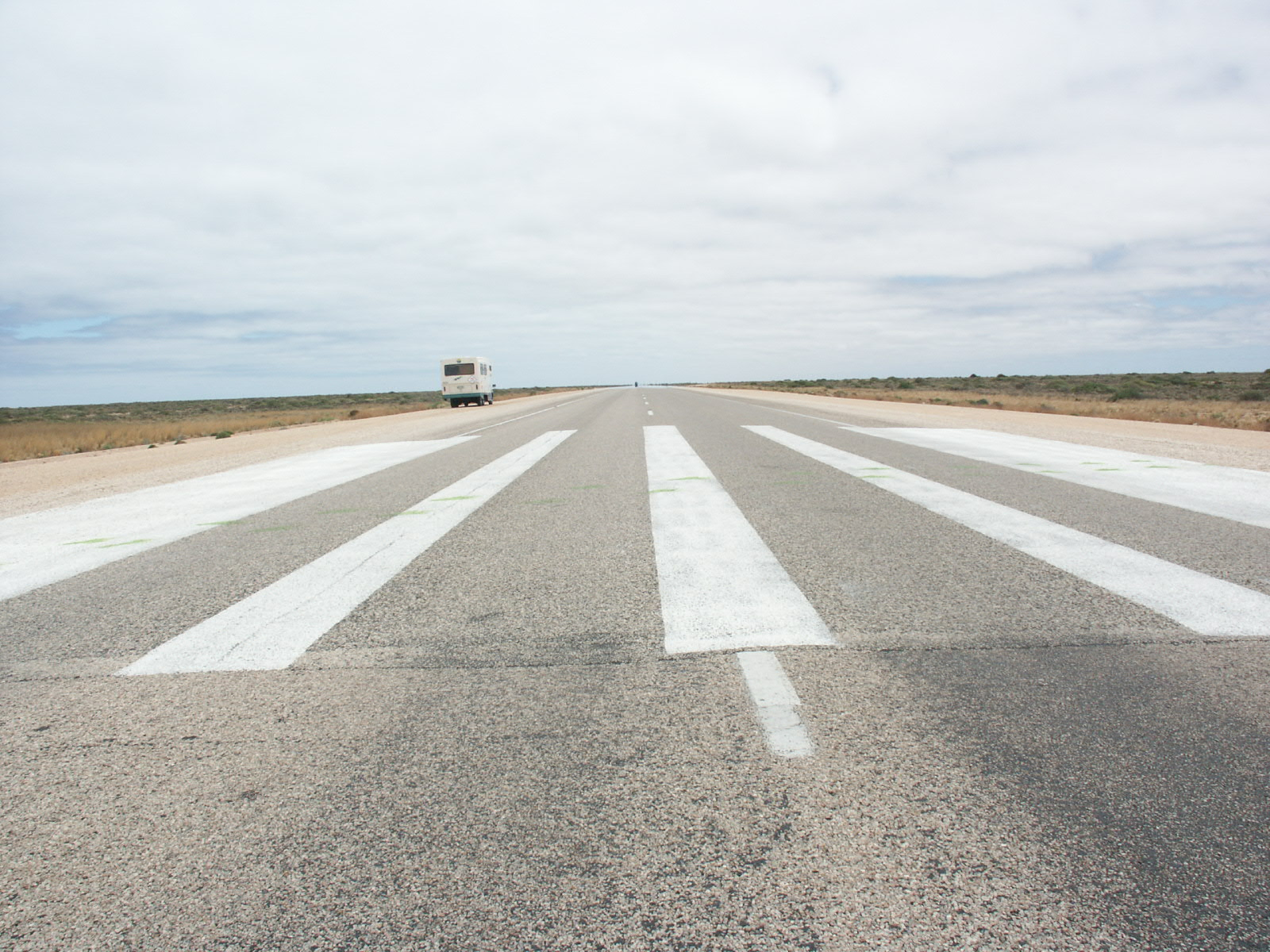
A Royal Flying Doctor Service emergency airstrip

== History ==
=== Background ===
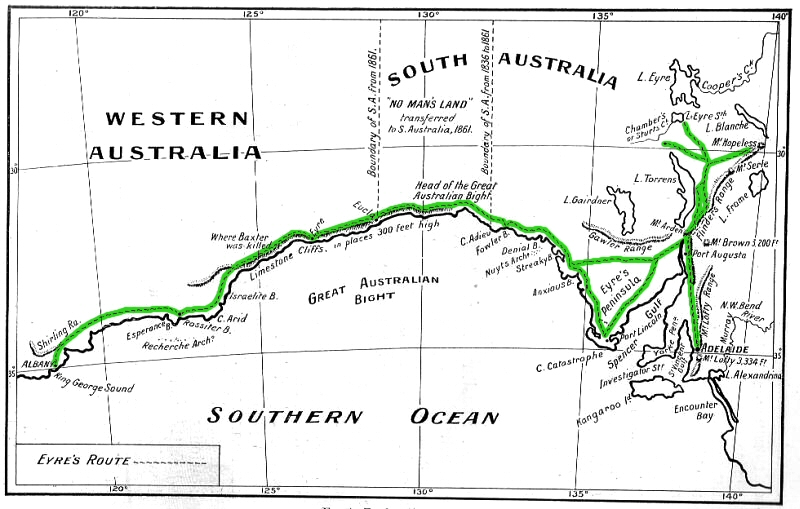
Edward John Eyre's expeditions, including along the coastline of the Great Australian Bight and the Nullarbor Plain

In 1840–1841, Edward John Eyre was the first European to traverse the coastline of the Great Australian Bight and the Nullarbor Plain by land, on an almost 2,000-mile (3,200 km) trip from Adelaide to Albany, Western Australia.

Three decades later, the East–West Telegraph line was installed. Constructed between 1875 and 1877, it followed the same route across the Nullarbor and along the Great Australian Bight, after John Forrest retraced Eyre's route in 1870 and confirmed its suitability. Repeater stations were installed at Port Lincoln, Streaky Bay, Smoky Bay, Fowlers Bay, Eucla, Israelite Bay, Esperance and Bremer Bay. Stations were later added at Franklin Harbour (Cowell) in 1885, Yardea in 1896 and Balladonia in 1897.

From 1912 to 1917, an inland route across the Nullarbor was established with the construction of the Trans-Australian Railway, from Port Augusta via Tarcoola to Kalgoorlie. With few roads or tracks encountering the line, most of it is only accessible by rail.

=== Highway planning and construction ===
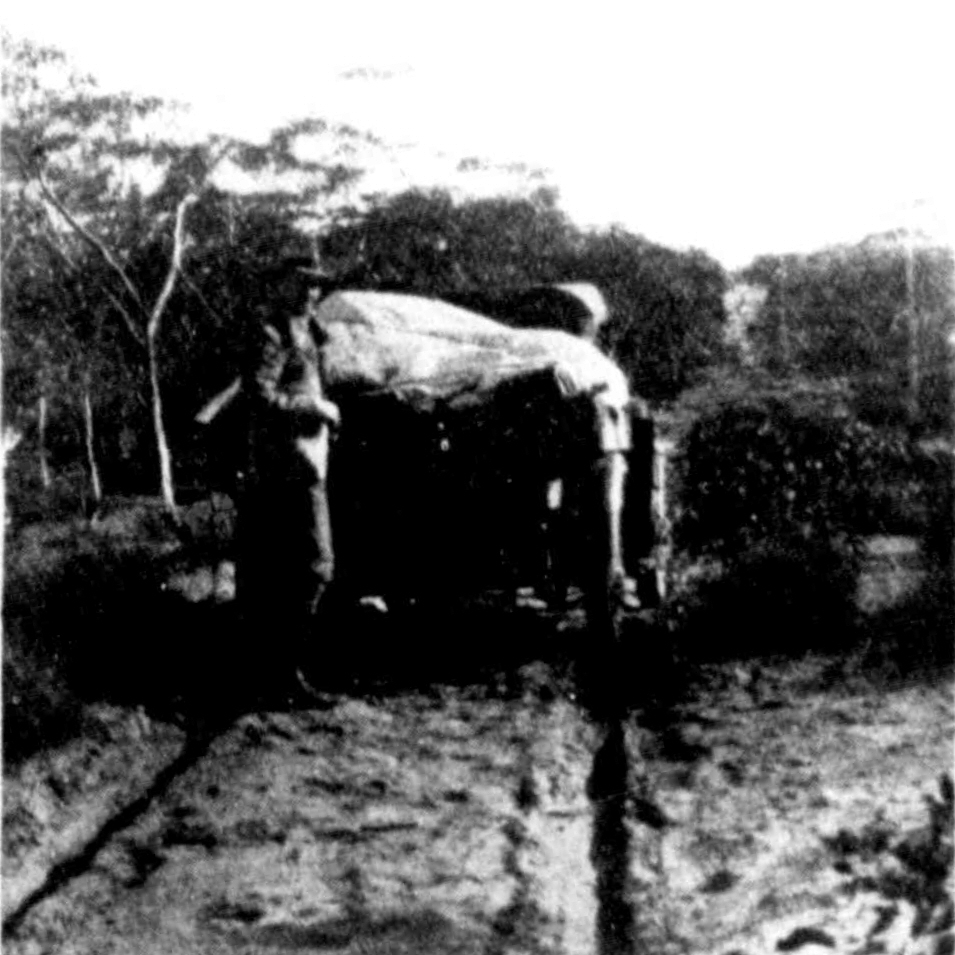
The trail heading west to Ceduna in 1929

The construction of the telegraph had resulted in a trail that could be followed for interstate travel, but it was a haphazard route which only the more adventurous motorists would take. Many travellers were unprepared for the harsh conditions and lack of services. They would cause a nuisance for station owners and other travellers by scrounging petrol, contaminating water supplies, leaving gates open, and committing acts of vandalism.

In 1938 the Royal Automobile Club of Western Australia (RAC) called for a national highway to be constructed by the federal government, as it would be a strategic defence road, provide another link between Western Australia and other states, and improve the tourist experience. The federal government did not see the road as important enough for its involvement.

In May 1941, following the construction of the central north–south Stuart Highway, the federal government announced its decision to build the east–west highway between Norseman and Port Augusta. A northerly route, close to the Trans-Australian Railway, had been considered, but extensive limestone outcrops made it impractical. Taking a route east from Norseman, with some detours around limestone ridges, would allow a road to be formed quickly and easily. With a war in the Pacific seemingly imminent, construction began in July 1941. The Army was responsible for fuel, food, and communications, while the state government departments of Main Roads (Western Australia) and Highways (South Australia) managed the construction.

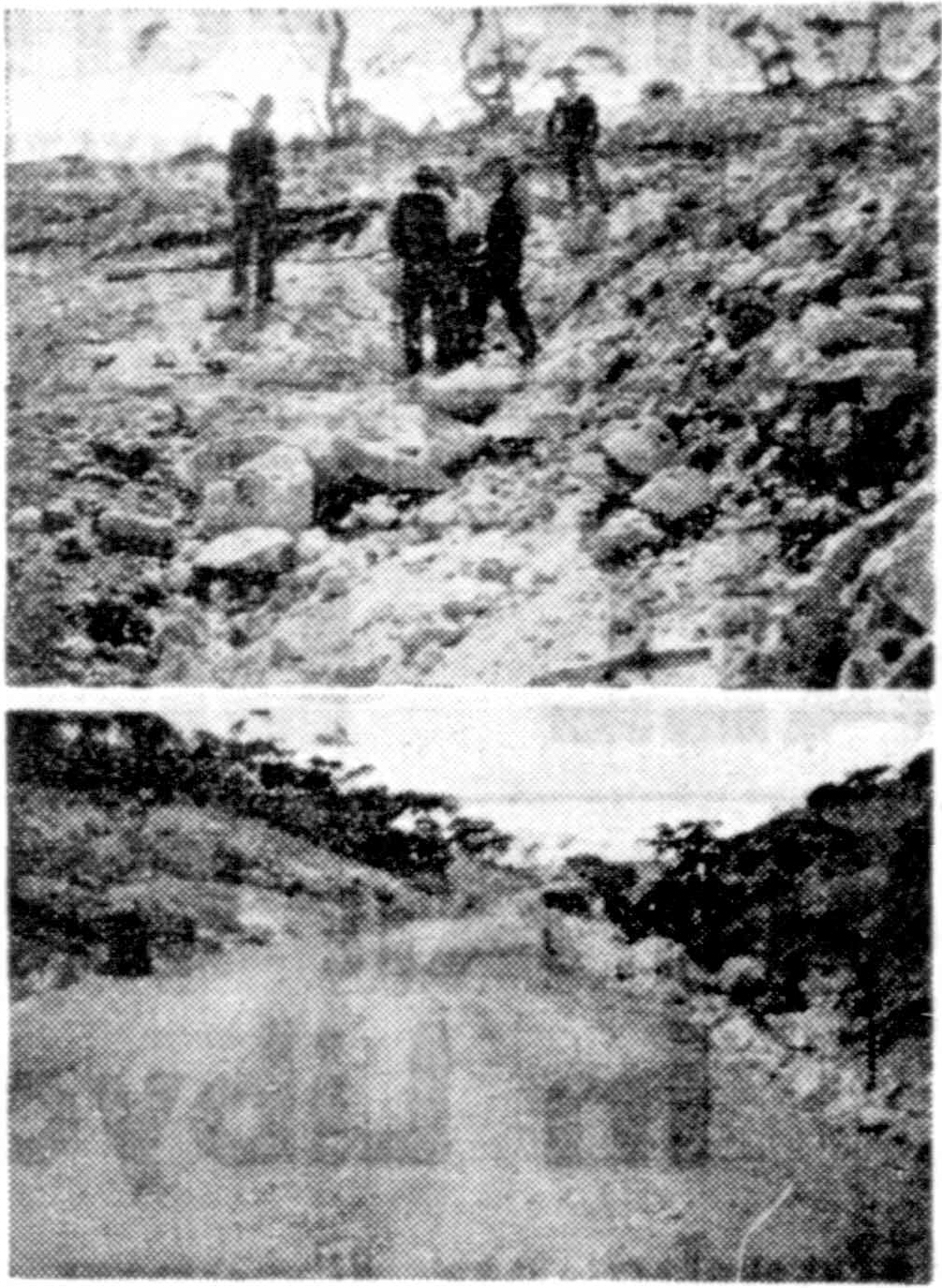
The Madura Pass section in 1941, before (top) and after (bottom) construction

The road was completed in June 1942. Construction cost twice the initial £125,000 estimate over a period of four months. The road was sufficiently trafficable and in use by January 1942. The finished road, while an improvement over the previous route, still was not much more than a track. The only sections with a bitumen surface were the Madura and Eucla Passes. The formed width was 30 feet (9 m), with some sections (Note: In Western Australia, approximately 280 out 452 miles (450 out of 727 km)) lightly gravelled over a 16-foot (4.9 m) width.

By the middle of the century, several water tanks with up to 44,000 imperial gallons (200,000 L; 53,000 US gal) capacity were located alongside the highway, including at Madura Pass, Moonera, Cocklebiddy, and 28 miles (45 km) east of Mundrabilla. In some cases the tanks were accompanied by amenity such as a shed, or a hut and stove, or even petrol and cafes at Ivy Tanks. The establishment of Ivy Tanks in any form was being lost by the 1980s.

=== Naming ===
In the 1930s and 1940s, the Western Australian Nomenclature Advisory Committee (Note: Now the Geographic Names Committee) had been choosing directional names for the state's main arterial roads, such as Great Eastern Highway. The South Australian Highways Department had been naming the major roads to other states after explorers, such as Flinders Highway, named after Matthew Flinders. In 1938, the historical memorials committee of the Royal Geographical Society in South Australia was disappointed that no road had been named after Eyre, despite its suggestion that the road from Port Augusta towards Perth should be Eyre Highway. In the same year, the RAC suggested that the proposed new highway be named Forrest Highway, after John Forrest. The Assistant Minister for Commerce, Senator Macdonald, concurred.

On 21 January 1942, Prime Minister John Curtin announced the war cabinet decision to name the newly constructed road Forrest Highway, for military purposes. Separately, the states' nomenclature committees were considering names for the road. A proposal for a single name to be used in both states was put by the Western Australian committee to the South Australian committee when the highway was completed. Two names were suggested: Great Western Highway, in line with similar directional names in Western Australia, and Eyre Highway, after the explorer. After several communications between the committees, both decided to use the name Eyre Highway. After receiving a letter from the South Australian Premier in May 1943, supporting the nomenclature committee's recommendation, Curtin agreed to the name, subject to approval from the Western Australian government.

The South Australian section was named Eyre Highway on 20 May 1943, with the portion from Murat Bay (Ceduna) to the state border declared a main road. Eyre Highway was gazetted in Western Australia on 11 June 1943, and included the road from Coolgardie to Norseman until Coolgardie–Esperance Highway was gazetted on 16 August 1957.

=== Sealing ===
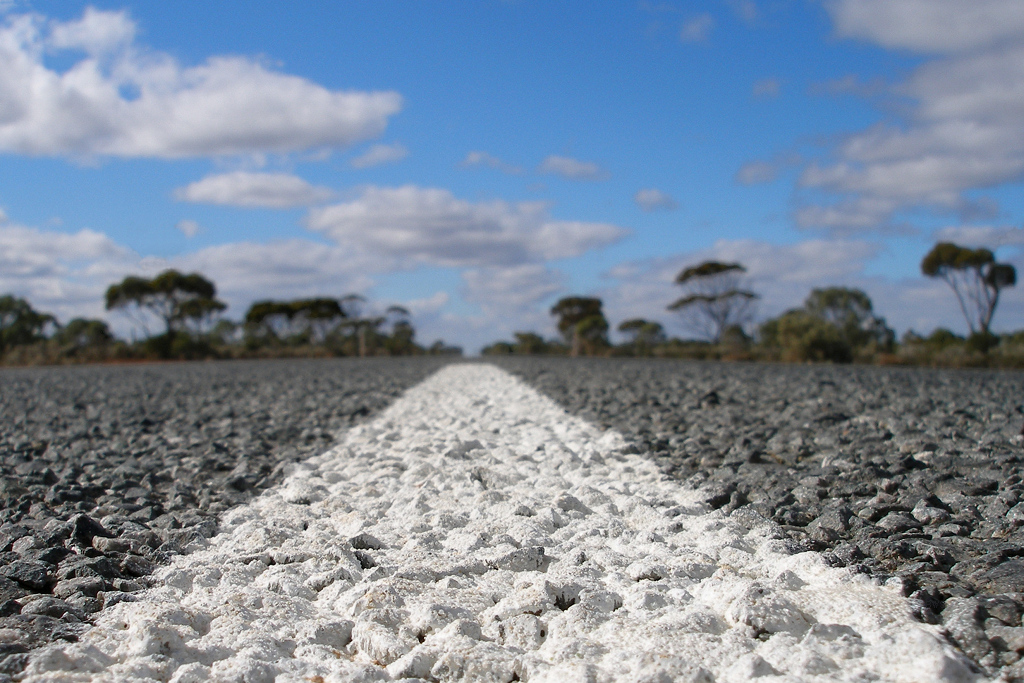
A sealed surface at the west end of "90 Mile Straight", looking east

The state of Eyre Highway remained relatively unchanged throughout the 1940s and 1950s. The road received yearly maintenance, but further, more expensive works were not warranted due to the low traffic volume of approximately fourteen vehicles per day. The maintenance and grading was hindered by a lack of rainfall – the road was smoothed out each year, and small sections were gravelled, but the soil the road was made from was too weak to be an effective road surface. When it did rain, even in small amounts, the road would become boggy, from patches that had broken down into a powdery substance, known as "bulldust", during dry periods. Large numbers of vehicles travelling the highway in 1962, for the Commonwealth Games in Perth, damaged the road in numerous locations, and the lack of moisture required salt water to be pumped from 350 feet (110 m) below the surface for use in repairs and maintenance.

Work to seal Eyre Highway was undertaken in the 1960s and 1970s. As the federal government refused requests from Western Australia and South Australia for a special allocation to fund the sealed road, the work was left for the states to finance, over a number of years. Construction began in 1960, at the Norseman end. By the end of that year five miles (8 km) had been reconstructed, and was ready to be sealed over a 20-foot (6 m) width. Fourteen miles (23 km) were sealed in 1961, another 67 miles (108 km) were completed by 1963, and in 1964 the seal reached 111 miles (179 km) out from Norseman. By the mid-1960s, approximately 60 miles (100 km) were being sealed each year. With increased priority given to the project from 1966, Western Australia's portion of the highway was completed in 1969, with a ceremony held in Eucla on 17 October.

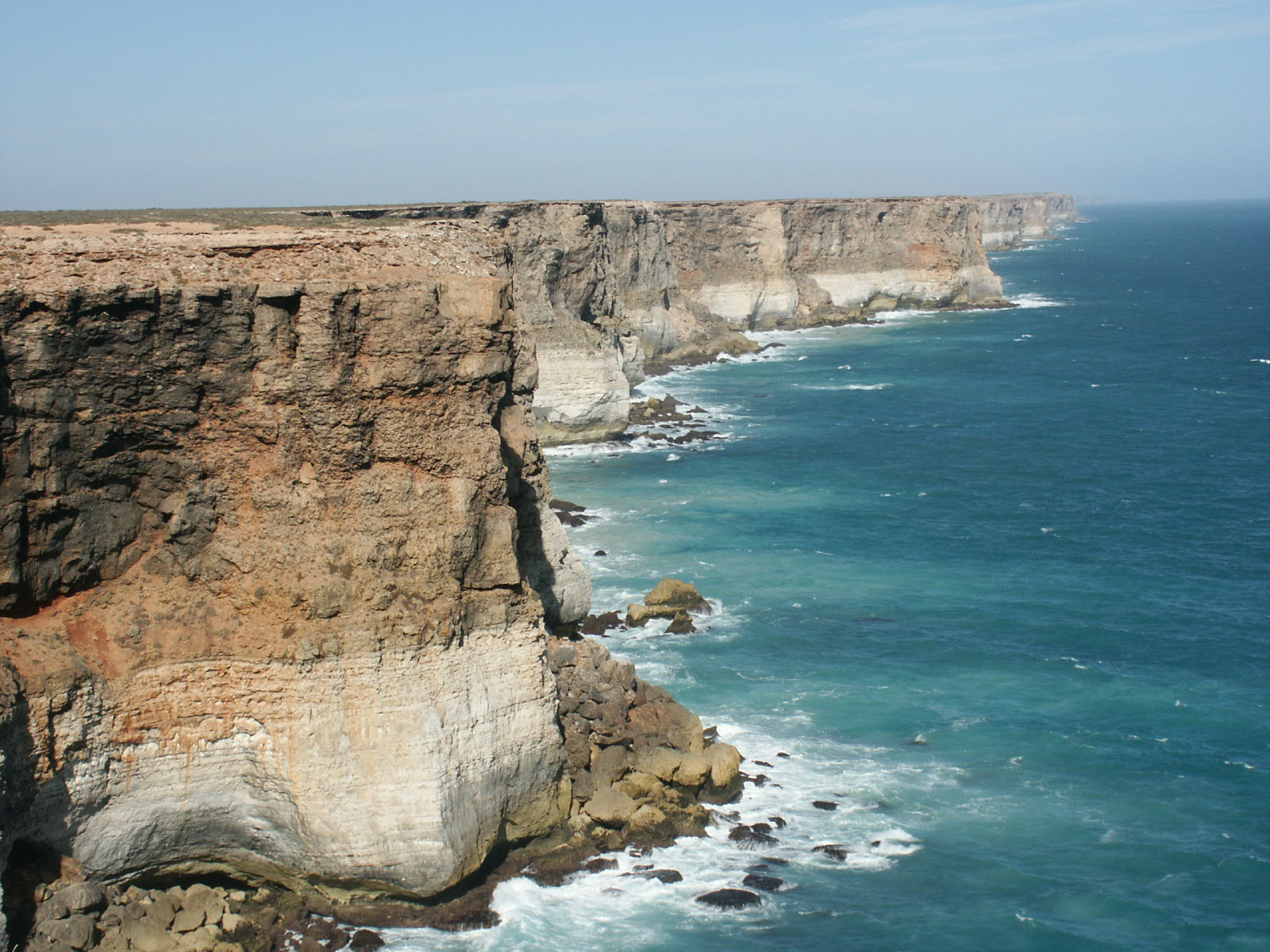
The Great Australian Bight is a short detour away at several places along the highway.

In South Australia, a decade-long program to seal the highway began in the mid-1960s. The first section completed was the 462-kilometre (287 mi) route between Port Augusta and Ceduna, in December 1967. In October 1972 the Ceduna to Penong seal was completed. The final link to be sealed, between Penong and the state border, was completed with a ceremony held in September 1976 near Wigunda Tank, South Australia.

Between Yalata and the state border, the highway was realigned and deviated considerably from the original unsealed route. In deciding the new alignment for the South Australian section of the highway between Yalata and the state border, long, straight, flat sections were purposely avoided to prevent driver boredom and consequent fatigue, as well as sun-glare and glare from oncoming headlights. The new alignment also took into consideration the potential tourism opportunities provided along the coast of the Great Australian Bight.

The older route, Old Eyre Highway, runs from Border Village to the Nullarbor Homestead, approximately 15 to 20 kilometres (9 to 12 mi) away from the coast. Another section from the Nullarbor Homestead to Nundroo Motel also travelled further inland than the new alignment, past Ivy Tank Motel and Yalata Roadhouse.

=== Further improvements ===
The 1960s standard of a twenty-foot (6.2 m) sealed width with four-foot-wide (1.2 m) gravel shoulders was proving to be inadequate by the 1980s. Increasing numbers of truck and tourist coaches caused fretting, and reduced the actual sealed width to 5.6 metres (18 ft) along much of Eyre Highway. Main Roads in Western Australia spent around a million dollars a year on rehabilitating 50-to-100-kilometre (30 to 60 mi) sections. A major project to improve Eyre Highway, rather than just repair the damage, began in 1984 with federal government providing funding to reconstruct 300 kilometres (190 mi) in Western Australia.

The highway was rebuilt with a seven-metre-wide (23 ft) pavement, with shoulders partially sealed to a width of one metre (3 ft 3 in). Work began in mid-1985 near Cocklebiddy, with a 58-kilometre-long (36 mi) section completed in 1986. Work undertaken from 1987 to 1988 reached out 110 kilometres (68 mi) east of Cocklebiddy, and 225 kilometres (140 mi) had been completed by June 1990. The upgrade from Cocklebiddy to the state border was completed in October 1994.

Since the 1990s, regular maintenance and minor improvements have been an ongoing effort. There have been larger-scale works including reconstruction of sections near Caiguna, Balladonia, and the Frazer Range in Western Australia, as well as Cungena and Kyancutta in South Australia.

== Major intersections ==
State	LGA	Location	km	mi	Destinations	Notes
Western Australia	Dundas	Norseman	0.0	0.0	Coolgardie–Esperance Highway (National Highway 94 north, National Route 1 south) – Coolgardie, Kalgoorlie, Perth, Esperance	Western terminus of highway and National Highway 1
Western Australia	Dundas	Norseman	0.3	0.19	Esperance branch railway	
Western Australia	Dundas	Eucla	707	439	Eucla–Reid Road – Eucla, Eucla Airport	
Western Australia	Dundas	Eucla	720	450	Eyre Highway (National Highway 1)	Eastern terminus of National Highway 1
State border			720	450	Western Australia – South Australia state border	
South Australia	Pastoral Unincorporated Area	Nullarbor	720	450	Eyre Highway (A1)	Western terminus of route A1
South Australia	Ceduna	Ceduna	1,196	743	Eyre Peninsula Railway	
South Australia	Ceduna	Ceduna	1,200	750	Eyre Peninsula Railway	
South Australia	Ceduna	Ceduna	1,204	748	Flinders Highway (B100) – Streaky Bay, Port Lincoln	
South Australia	Streaky Bay	Poochera	1,337	831	Streaky Bay Road – Streaky Bay	
South Australia	Wudinna	Kyancutta	1,422	884	Tod Highway (B90 south) – Lock, Port Lincoln	T-junction: Eyre Highway continues east
South Australia	Wudinna	Kyancutta	1,423	884	Eyre Peninsula Railway	
South Australia	Kimba	Kimba	1,509	938	Eyre Peninsula Railway	
South Australia	Kimba	Kimba	1,510	940	Cleve Road – Cleve, Arno Bay	
South Australia	Pastoral Unincorporated Area	Iron Knob	1,598	993	Iron Knob Road – Iron Knob, Whyalla	
South Australia	Pastoral Unincorporated Area	Lincoln Gap	1,640	1,020	Lincoln Highway (B100 southwest) – Whyalla, Port Lincoln	T-junction: Eyre Highway continues northeast
South Australia	Pastoral Unincorporated Area	Lincoln Gap	1,651	1,026	Whyalla railway line	
South Australia	Port Augusta	Port Augusta West	1,664	1,034	Stuart Highway (A87 north) – Coober Pedy, Alice Springs, Darwin	
South Australia	Port Augusta	Port Augusta West	1,664	1,034	Augusta Highway (A1 east) – Port Wakefield, Snowtown, Adelaide	Eastern terminus of highway, route A1 continues east along Augusta Highway
Route transition

== See also ==
- Highway 1 (South Australia)
- Highway 1 (Western Australia)
- List of roadhouses in Western Australia
