= Wudinna, South Australia =

Wudinna
- Town
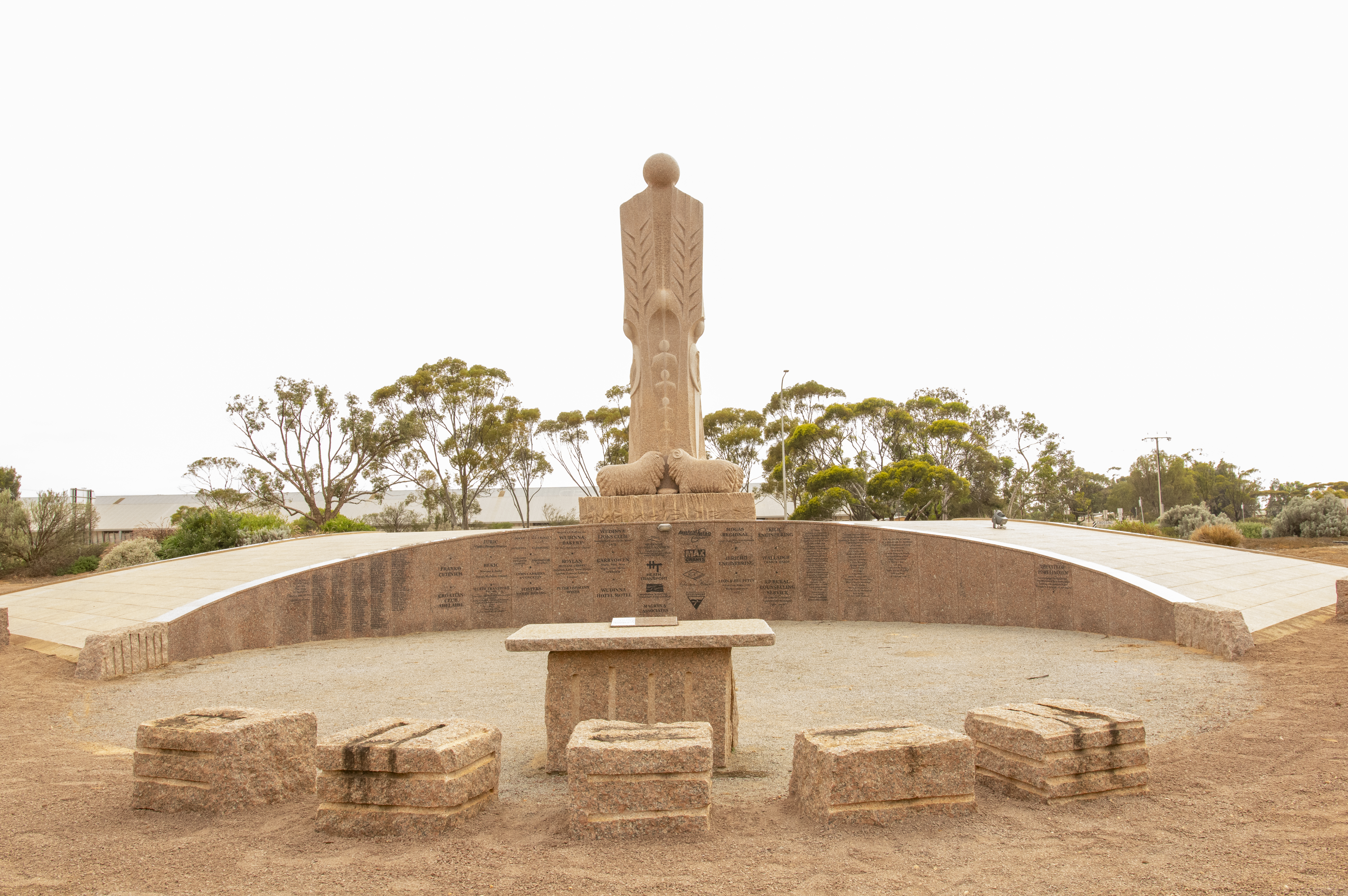
- Australian Farmer, an 8-metre (26-foot) statue in Wudinna made from local granite

- Interactive map of Wudinna
- Coordinates: 33°02′S 135°27′E
- Country: Australia
- State: South Australia
- LGA: Wudinna
- Location: 570 km (350 mi) NW of Adelaide
- Established: 1916

Government
  - State electorate: Flinders
  - Federal division: Grey
- Elevation: 77 m (253 ft)

Population
  - Total: 516 (UCL 2021)
- Postcode: 5652
- Mean max temp: 25.4 °C (77.7 °F)
- Mean min temp: 10.1 °C (50.2 °F)
- Annual rainfall: 275.5 mm (10.85 in)

Wudinna (/ˈwʊdənə/ WUUD-ə-nə) is a town of about 500 people on the Eyre Highway in the wheat-growing region of Eyre Peninsula, South Australia.

== History ==
Since time immemorial, Wudinna has been part of the country visited from the east coast of Eyre Peninsula, seasonally and for ceremonial and special purposes, by the Barngarla people. The Barngarla name is "Woodina", meaning "granite hill". The area was first settled by Europeans in 1861, after Robert George Standley lodged a claim for 10 square kilometres (4 sq mi) of land surrounding what was then referred to as Weedna Hill.

The town, which was proclaimed in 1916, serves as the seat of the Wudinna District Council. In 2023, it won the South Australian Department of Primary Industries and Regions Agricultural Town of the Year award. In 2024 the town held its inaugural Granite Rocks music festival.

== Geography ==
The region is known as "granite country" for its deposits of granite, accessible along a "granite trail". Quarrying began at the Desert Rose quarry, near Mount Wudinna, in the 1990s. Blocks up to 8 cubic metres (280 cubic feet), weighing 20 tonnes (20 long tons; 22 short tons) are cut into smaller blocks for shipping around Australia or for export to Asian and European markets. An 8-metre (26-foot) statue in the town, Australian Farmer, commemorating the area's settlers, is made from local granite.

Mount Wudinna, located 12 kilometres (7 mi) north-east of the township, is listed on the South Australian Heritage Register. It is the largest and most impressive of the granite outcrops on north-west Eyre Peninsula and is a good example of a stepped inselberg.

The Gawler Ranges National Park is 40 kilometres (25 miles) north of the town. A 7-kilometre (4.3 mi) bike-and-walking trail runs from Wudinna to Polda Rock Recreation Reserve.

=== Climate ===
Wudinna has a semi-arid climate (Köppen: BSk/BSh), with hot, dry summers and mild, somewhat wetter winters. Temperatures vary throughout the year, with average maxima ranging from 33.4 °C (92.1 °F) in January to 17.1 °C (62.8 °F) in July, and average minima fluctuating between 15.6 °C (60.1 °F) in January and 5.6 °C (42.1 °F) in August. Annual precipitation is low, averaging 275.5 mm (10.85 in) between 97.7 precipitation days. Extreme temperatures have ranged from 48.4 °C (119.1 °F) on 19 December 2019 to −4.0 °C (24.8 °F) on 7 August 2023.

Climate data for Wudinna (33º02'24"S, 135º27'00"E, 86 m AMSL) (1999-2024 normals and extremes)
Month	Jan	Feb	Mar	Apr	May	Jun	Jul	Aug	Sep	Oct	Nov	Dec	Year
Record high °C (°F)	48.2 (118.8)	46.9 (116.4)	43.5 (110.3)	40.0 (104.0)	32.3 (90.1)	27.6 (81.7)	25.6 (78.1)	32.6 (90.7)	37.5 (99.5)	41.5 (106.7)	46.0 (114.8)	48.4 (119.1)	48.4 (119.1)
Mean daily maximum °C (°F)	33.4 (92.1)	32.7 (90.9)	29.7 (85.5)	25.4 (77.7)	20.9 (69.6)	17.4 (63.3)	17.1 (62.8)	18.7 (65.7)	22.7 (72.9)	26.0 (78.8)	29.2 (84.6)	31.2 (88.2)	25.4 (77.7)
Mean daily minimum °C (°F)	15.6 (60.1)	15.0 (59.0)	13.0 (55.4)	10.1 (50.2)	8.3 (46.9)	6.6 (43.9)	6.1 (43.0)	5.6 (42.1)	7.2 (45.0)	8.8 (47.8)	11.6 (52.9)	13.5 (56.3)	10.1 (50.2)
Record low °C (°F)	4.0 (39.2)	5.8 (42.4)	2.2 (36.0)	−0.1 (31.8)	−1.7 (28.9)	−3.7 (25.3)	−3.0 (26.6)	−4.0 (24.8)	−2.9 (26.8)	−1.9 (28.6)	1.2 (34.2)	3.3 (37.9)	−4.0 (24.8)
Average precipitation mm (inches)	15.1 (0.59)	14.3 (0.56)	15.2 (0.60)	16.9 (0.67)	22.9 (0.90)	37.2 (1.46)	32.5 (1.28)	34.7 (1.37)	24.7 (0.97)	21.0 (0.83)	22.1 (0.87)	18.7 (0.74)	275.5 (10.85)
Average precipitation days (≥ 0.2 mm)	3.8	3.3	4.4	6.2	9.3	13.8	14.5	14.8	9.5	7.0	6.1	5.0	97.7
Average afternoon relative humidity (%)	23	26	29	36	45	54	55	47	39	30	25	26	36
Average dew point °C (°F)	5.0 (41.0)	6.6 (43.9)	5.3 (41.5)	5.5 (41.9)	6.1 (43.0)	6.1 (43.0)	6.0 (42.8)	4.5 (40.1)	4.1 (39.4)	2.2 (36.0)	2.9 (37.2)	4.0 (39.2)	4.9 (40.8)
Source: Bureau of Meteorology (1999-2024 normals and extremes)

== Economy ==
Wudinna is a major rural service centre: as of 2023 about 44 per cent of its workforce was employed in the agriculture sector and 74 per cent of its exports were agricultural products. It is the base for a farmer-owned organisation, Agricultural Innovation and Research Eyre Peninsula, which conducts research, development and extension for dryland farming systems. Eyre Peninsula Cooperative Bulk Handling, which supports Eyre Peninsula farm business owners with grain transport, storage and handling, supply chain logistics and exporting, also has its headquarters in the town.

== Notable people ==
- Harrison Petty, professional Australian rules football player
- Hannah Petty, Australian netball player
