= Big things (Australia) =

Novelty structures and sculptures

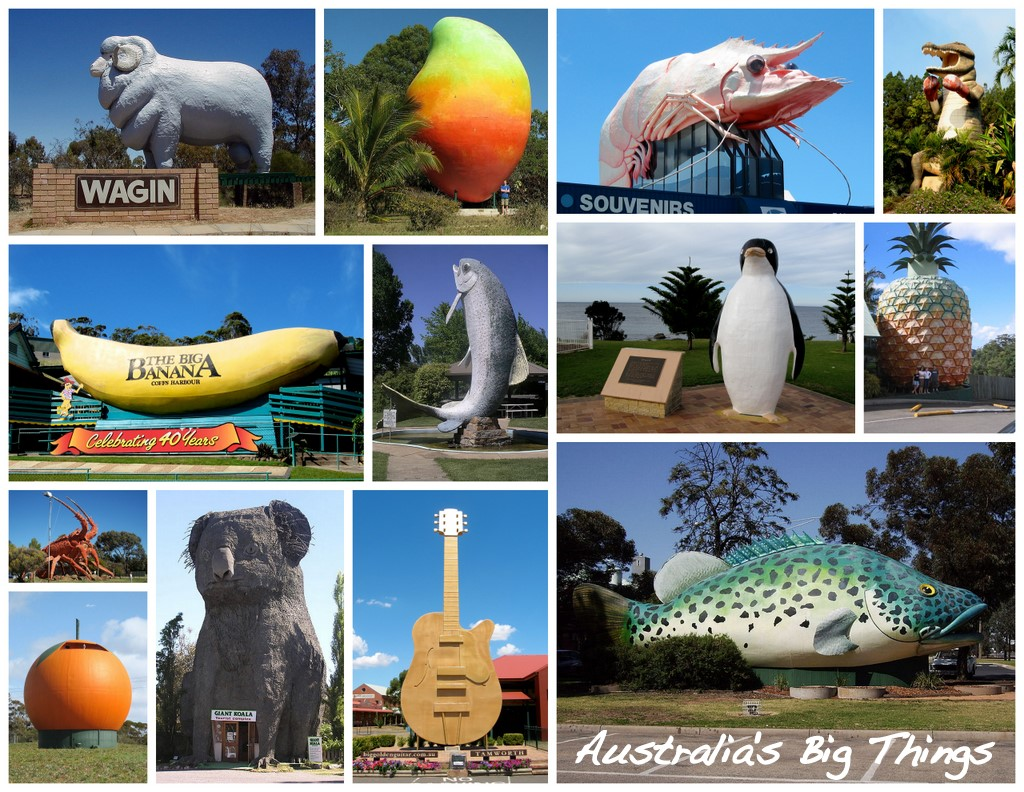
A selection of Australia's big things

The big things of Australia are large structures, some of which are novelty architecture and some sculptures. In Australia, big things have come to be seen as a uniquely Australian phenomenon, although they emerged at the same time as the so-called Roadside Giants (fibreglass sculptures of things) of the United States.

These structures have become known landmarks scattered throughout the country. As of 2022, there were 1,075 big things in Australia across all continental states and territories.

== History and importance ==
Many of these sculptures originally emerged as an inspiration from the growing trend of roadside attractions in the United States during the mid 20th century. They were built as promotional advertisements, art installations or to draw attention to small towns and businesses, becoming tourist icons in the process.

They are also generally considered comedic and intended to be funny as Australia generally has a cultural preference against earnestness and does not take itself too seriously. Artist and musician Reg Mombassa, who created a series of postage stamps featuring the big things in 2007, once compared them to pyramids and temples. Mombassa has many memories of the big things and said of them:

You'd be on these long, long trips and they'd break the tedium. The tackiness of the Big Things is a part of their charm, and their typically extroverted Australian phenomenon. Some of them are pretty crappy but others are definitely folk art, like the Big Merino, where they've recreated the texture of wool in concrete.

— Reg Mombassa (2024)

There is conjecture about which big thing was the first with there being a division of opinion as to whether it was The Big Banana in Coffs Harbour built in 1964 or Ploddy the Dinosaur who was constructed at the Australian Reptile Park in 1963. Much of this is due to a lack of clarity about what is considered a big thing and whether it is required that they are roadside attractions. It is also worth noting that, when first built, Ploddy the Dinosaur was not named and not necessarily considered an attraction in and of himself.

In 2009, the Big Pineapple in Queensland was heritage listed.

== List of big things (by state or territory) ==
=== Australian Capital Territory ===
Name	Location	Built	Size	Notes	Image
Big Acorns	National Arboretum Canberra in Molonglo Valley	2013		The giant acorns are children's play equipment at the playground. Often referred to as the 'Acorn Park'.	
The Big Bunyip	Corner of Hibberson Street And Gozzard Street, Gungahlin	2011		The Big Bunyip is based on Alexander Bunyip from the 1972 children's book, The Monster That Ate Canberra by Michael Salmon.	
Big Coins	Royal Australian Mint 62–114 Denison St, Deakin			The Big Coins are a group of sculptures located in Deakin, Australian Capital Territory next to the Royal Australian Mint.	
Big Swoop	Garema Place	2022	2.4x3.5 m	Big Swoop depicts an Australian magpie pecking at a chip.	
Big Galahs	Watson	2013		Project of artists Bev Hogg and Elizabeth Patterson, the Galahs mark the entrance to a modern planned community, and represent the concept of new families nesting in the area.	
Giant Mushroom	Belconnen	1998	8×4 m (26×13 ft)	Located in the Belconnen Fresh Food Markets, the Giant Mushroom shelters a children's playground. It was officially launched in 1998 by the ACT Chief Minister. No longer exists as of 2022.	
The Big Powerful Owl	Belconnen	2011	8 m (26 ft)	Located at the main entrance to Belconnen town centre, the statue cost $400,000 and was built by Melbourne sculptor Bruce Armstrong.	
Big Pool Ball	Yarralumla	2019	1.8 m (5'10")	Located at Yarralumla Play Station, which is home to one of the largest mini-golf courses in Australia.	
Big Coffee Pot and Cup	Monash	1993		Located at the main entrance/courtyard of the CIC (Canberra Islamic Centre).	

=== New South Wales ===
Name	Location	Built	Size	Notes	Image
Big Ant	Broken Hill	1980		A bull ant sculpture designed by artist Pro Hart, which was erected in 1980 and originally stood at the Stephens Creek Hotel. It was moved to its current location next to the Tourist Information Centre in Broken Hill after being donated to the city in 1990.	
Big Apple	Batlow			Located in the middle of an orchard about 3 km north of Batlow; no public access. Only its top is visible from Batlow-Tumut Road, as it is largely blocked by apple trees.	
Big Apple	Tallong			Located on Caoura Rd at Jim Watling Park. Tallong is home to the big apple and host to the award-winning annual "Apple Day" festival. The Big Apple made its return at the 2016 Apple Day festival.	
Big Apple	Yerrinbool; 34.348504°S 150.554299°E			Visible from the Hume Highway	
Big Avocado	Duranbah			Located at Tropical Fruit World.	
The Big Axe	Kew	1979	8 m (26 ft)	Located at the Kew Visitor Information Centre. The original sculpture was replaced in 2002 as a result of ant induced damage. The Axe was remodelled and a new one was displayed on 26 January 2017.	
Big Ayers Rock	North Arm Cove	1990		This 1:40 scale model of Uluru was formerly an attraction at Leyland Brothers World, and later formed the roof of the Rock Restaurant. Technically not a "Big Thing" as it was substantially smaller than the item it is modelled on, however, the Rock Restaurant was loosely grouped with the big things as an object of roadside art. It was destroyed in a fire on 31 July 2018.	
Big Banana	Coffs Harbour	1964	13×5 m (43×16 ft)	Sometimes incorrectly claimed to be the first Big Thing in Australia. (The Big Scotsman in Adelaide was built more than a year earlier). The Big Banana tourist complex includes a banana-themed souvenir shop, tours of the surrounding plantation and an indoor ski slope.	Australian big thing in Coffs Harbour
The Big Beer Can	Cobar	1990	5×2.5 m (16.4×8.2 ft)	The Big Beer Can has a Tooheys New design, and is located above the entrance to the Grand Hotel.	
The Big Beer Can	Newcastle NSW	2026		The Good Folk Big Danny's Wedge Beer can is located in Kotara Bowling Club Newcastle NSW	
The Big Grifter Beer Can	Marrickville NSW	2026	10m	The Big Grifter Beer Can is located at Grifter Brewing in Marrickville NSW	
Big Bench	Broken Hill	September 2002		As part of the Landscapes and Backgrounds exhibition, a 2.5 times scale park bench was constructed in the Line of Lode Reserve, which is on top of a high hill of mine deposits in the centre of the city of Broken Hill.	
The Big Blue Heeler	Muswellbrook	2001	2 m (6.6 ft) high	Statue of an Australian Cattle Dog ("blue heeler"). Located adjacent to the town information centre.	
The Big Bogan	Nyngan	2015	5.96 metres (19.6 ft) high	The Big Bogan is the creation of Reverend Graham McLeod from Nyngan's St Mark's Anglican Church. Located on Pangee Street next to the railway lines. In 2022 a dog was added.	Big Bogan, Nyngan, 2017 (01)
Big Bowl	Lake Cathie	1975		A 10-foot-high (3.0 m) replica of a lawn bowl, consisting of one and a half tonnes of steel and concrete.	
Big Bull	Wauchope		14×21 m (46×69 ft)	The Big Bull was pulled down in October 2007.	
Big Bunch of Bananas	Coffs Harbour			Formerly located in Sawtell, the Big Bunch of Bananas was relocated when the Pacific Highway bypassed the town and now lays just to the south of Coffs Harbour.	
The Big Bicycle	Chullora	1997	9×6 m (30×20 ft)	Built by Jonh Ridley, Andy Lugiz and Phillip Becker; adorns the entrance to the Chullora Waste Transfer Station, Chullora.	
The Big Bush Turkey	Kyogle	2018	8.5 × 4 m	The Big Bush Turkey was constructed by a Kyogle couple, John and Chrystine Graham, and it is located on Summerland Way, 2.6 km from the town.	
The Big Chairlift	Jindabyne			The Big Chairlift is on the river walkway overlooking the Snowy River.	
Big Cheese	Bodalla			The Big Cheese is located at the former Bodalla Cheese factory on the Princes Highway. It is as of 2013 closed.	
Big Cherries	Young			Originally located off Short Street, but moved with the tourist information centre to Lovell Street at Young railway station.	
Big Chook	Moonbi	1970s	2×4 m (6.6×13.1 ft)		
Big Chook	Mount Vernon		4×4 m (13×13 ft)		
Big Dog	Dunkeld	2020	2.9 m (9.5 ft) high, weighs over 1 tonne	Located in Dunkeld between Bathurst and Orange. Made wholly of recycled metal collected from refuse centres, farms, discarded car parts, rusty tools etc. Sculptor Jane lives in Orange and was commissioned by Brendan.	
Don Bradman's Bat and Stumps	Cootamundra	1975	8m	Located on the western side of Bradman Oval; celebrates the career of cricket legend Don Bradman	
Big Fish	Manilla			The Big Fish is located at the Big Fish Roadhouse at 79 Arthur Street	
Big Funnel Web Spider	Jamberoo	2015	19.7×22.2 m (65×73 ft)	The Big Funnel Web Spider was built at Jamberoo Action Park and is a steel, fibreglass and concrete structure 420 times larger than a female Sydney funnel-web spider. It was awarded a Guinness World Record as the Largest Spider Sculpture in August 2015.	
The Big Gold Panner	Kelso	1979	5×3 m (16.4×9.8 ft)	Located in front of the Gold Panner Motor Inn.	
The Big Gold Pick and Pan	Grenfell	2005	Pick 4 m (13 ft), Pan 3 m (9.8 ft) (diam)	Located between the Goods Shed and historic Station Building at the Grenfell railway station precinct, just off the northern end of West Street.	
The Big Golden Guitar	Tamworth	1988	12×4 m (39×13 ft)	Modelled on the Golden Guitar trophies given to winners at the Country Music Awards of Australia ceremony night during the Tamworth Country Music Festival.	
The Big Hammer	Mudgee			Located at Rosby Wines (122 Strikes Lane, Eurunderee); previously located at the Fairview ArtSpace. Relocated in 2016 when the ArtSpace closed down.	
The Big Hat	Yeoval	2017		Sculpture of Banjo Paterson's hat. Made in 2014 and transported to Yeoval in 2017.	
The Big Headphones	Newcastle	2015	3 m (9.8 ft)	Located on Darby St, this fully operational pair of headphones was designed by Mark Tisdell and built in collaboration with Tom Ireland (fabrication and design detailing), Sean Bell (graphics), Adrian Garner (electrical engineering), Brad Phillips and Rhian Leek (architectural design), with the support of the Darby Street Traders Group.	
The Big Knight	Knockrow			This was previously at the entrance to the Macadamia Castle, a nut-themed park and store. In 2022 the site became the Byron Bay Wildlife Sanctuary and the Knight was removed.	
The Big Koala	Gundagai			Located at 31 Annie Pyers Dr, Gundagai NSW 2722 outside the Olivers store. Very close to the Dog on the Tuckerbox	
Big Koala Family	Port Macquarie	2003		Made by fibreglass experts Natureworks for Coffs Harbour Zoo, the trio of big koalas were moved to Billabong Zoo in Port Macquarie in 2003 after the Coffs Harbour Zoo closed.	
The Big Kookaburra	Kurri Kurri	2009	4.5 m (15 ft)	Sculpture by Chris Fussell. It is located in Rotary Park.	
The Big Lamb	Guyra	1988		Erected by the town and district to promote the lamb and potato industries in New England. The lamb is stood over a potato plant.	
The Big Magpie	Muswellbrook			Located in Simpson Park, adjacent to Muswellbrook railway station	
The Big Merino	Goulburn	1985	15×18 m (49×59 ft)	A sculpture of a merino ram, built in 1985. Goulburn and The Big Merino were bypassed by the Hume Highway in 1992, leading to a reduction in visitor numbers. On 26 May 2007, Rambo (as the Merino is locally known) was relocated by low-loader to a new home within sight of the highway.	
The Big Miner's Lamp	Bowenfels			Depicts a safety lamp.	
Big Mosquito	Hexham	1993		"Ozzie the Mozzie" at the Hexham Bowling Club is modelled on the locally abundant mosqiuto species Aedes alternans, commonly known as the Hexham grey. It includes illuminated eyes which switch on at night.	
The Big Motorcycle	Mooball	c. 2014.	3 m tall.	The Big Motorcycle, is located across the road from the Moo Moo Roadhouse. It is a replica of the Yamaha YZR500 ridden by Wayne Rainey in 1993.	
Big Murray Cod	Tocumwal	1967	2×7 m (6.6×23.0 ft)	Located near the corner of Deniliquin Rd and Murray St, near the Murray River.	
The Big Orange – Mourquong (Mildura)	Mourquong, NSW near Mildura VIC			Located north of Mildura, at 93 Link Rd, Mourquong.	
The Big Orange Goblin	Marrickville	2025	10 m (32.8 ft)	Located in the Inner West at the heart of Sydney's "Ale Trail", this 30-tonne beer can is also a functioning grain silo used by The Grifter Brewing Co. The towering artwork is a realistic depiction of their best-selling beer: The Grifter Pale Ale, affectionately known as "The Orange Goblin".	
The Big Oyster	Taree		12×4 m (39×13 ft)		
The Big Playable Guitar	Narrandera	1991	6×2 m (19.7×6.6 ft)	The largest playable guitar in the world.	
Ploddy the Dinosaur	Somersby	1963	4.8×2 m (15.7×6.6 ft)	Situated in the Australian Reptile Park and commissioned by the Park's founder, Eric Worrell. The concrete structure is based on the shape of a Diplodocus; it is 30 metres long and weighs almost 100 tonnes.	
The Big Peg	Canowindra	2017		A giant clothes peg located in a field beside the road between Canowindra and the village of Cargo. Designed by the Stacey Family and fabricated by Jake Willis of Canowindra; inspired by a similar structure in Belgium.	
The (other) Big Pineapple	Ballina		6x2m (approx)	Certainly a big thing – this pineapple is across the road from the big Prawn and is WAY bigger than a regular pineapple.	
The Big Potato	Robertson	1977	10×4 m (33×13 ft)	A giant potato constructed by farmer Jim Mauger in 1977. In 2025 it was transformed into 'The Pig Potato' to honour that the town is where Babe was filmed.	
The Big Poo	Kiama	2002	1×5 m (3.3×16.4 ft)	The Big Poo was built by local residents as a protest against Sydney Water's decision not to reuse waste water in the area. Built from foam, it was unveiled by Ian Cohen on 29 April 2002.	
The Big Prawn	Ballina	1989	6×9 m (20×30 ft)	On 24 September 2009, Ballina Shire Council voted to allow the demolition of the Big Prawn; however, Bunnings purchased the site in 2011 and refurbished the Prawn as part of the redevelopment. The prawn now sits on a stand next to the entrance of the Bunnings Warehouse carpark.	
Big Rabbit Trap	Albert	2013		A Big Rabbit Trap, located on the roof of the Rabbit Trap Hotel.	
The Big Rocket	Moree	2009	14 m (46 ft) high	The Big Rocket, launched during the International Year of Astronomy and the 40th anniversary of the first human Moon landing, is now next to a newer, larger, rocket playground which contains two slides and a space-themed command centre playground.	The original Big Rocket attraction in Moree, NSW, with the newer Big Rocket playground in the background.
Big Rubik's Cube	Maroubra	2008		A cement cube painted as per a Rubik's Cube on top of a storm water drain on Maroubra Beach. In December 2023 the Big Rubik's Cube was "solved" after being repainted by the original artists.	
The Big Slurpee	Coffs Harbour	2009	15 m (50 ft)	Dismantled in 2009.	
The Big Soldier	Uralla			In front of Hassett's Military Museum. Dressed in Digger-style uniform. Removed in 2022	
The Big Spider	Urana	2009		The Big Spider (named "Not so Itsy" by the artist) was created by Andrew Whitehead, a nearby resident of the town. The spider commemorates the local football club, who were, for many years, known as the Spiders, and is built from a range of materials – including a wash tub and a hot dog muffler.	
The World's Biggest Sundial	Singleton	1987		A 25-foot-high (7.6 m) sundial presented as a gift from Lemington Mine, to honour the occasion of the Australian Bicentenary. At the time of its creation, it was recognised by the Guinness Book of World Records as the world's largest sundial, and still lays claim to being the largest one-piece sundial in the Southern hemisphere.	
Big Swagman and Dog	Port Macquarie	1990s		The original Big Swaggie and Dog at Billabong Zoo in Port Macquarie was built in the 1990s by Robert Boffa (then owner of the Zoo). The Swagman was relocated in the late 90s when the Pacific Highway was upgraded, but the accompanying Big Dog remains at the original location.	
The Big Swan	Dunedoo			In front of the Swan Motel.	
Big Tennis Racquet	Barellan	3 October 2009	13.8 m (45 ft) long	Built in honour of Evonne Goolagong, who grew up in Barellan.	
The Big Trout	Adaminaby	1973	10×3 m (32.8×9.8 ft)	Designed by Andy Lomnici, the Big Trout is located in the town of Adaminaby, near Lake Eucumbene in the Snowy Mountains. It was built from fibreglass over a steel frame, completed in 1973, and repaired and repainted in 2023.	
The Big Trout	Oberon				
The Big Turtle	Forster			Carved from timber, the big turtle is located behind the main street of Forster on a riverside boardwalk.	
The Big UGG Boots	Thornton	20 April 2015		Mortels Sheepskin Factory is home to The Big UGG Boots. These big UGG boots are 13 times the size of a women's AUS/US size 8 UGG boot. The Big UGG Boots are located in the Lower Hunter Region of NSW, Newcastle end of the M1.	
Big Water Dragon	Port Macquarie	2017		A statue of an eastern water dragon (Intellagama lesueurii lesueurii) at Kooloonbung Creek Nature Reserve. Built by Bill Lawrence, Matt Penboss, and Lynley Kirkness.	
The Big Windmill	Coffs Harbour	1972		Although work started on the Big Windmill in 1972, the death of Franz De Kever in 1974 delayed completion until 1982, as it was not until the site was purchased by Hans Eecen that work was able to resume. The Big Windmill has since changed hands, and is now operated by Mark and Jodi Taylor. The site includes a 41-room motel and a restaurant.	
The Big Wine Barrel	Hanwood	1973		Located at the McWilliam's Winery. The cellar door with historical displays and a giant glass mural are located within.	
The Big Wine Bottle	Pokolbin	1998	7×1.5 m (23.0×4.9 ft)	Located at the Hunter Valley Gardens. The neck forms a chimney for an open fire contained within.	
The Big Wine Cask	Mourquong		8×6 m (26×20 ft)	Located at the Constellation Stanley winery, but as of December 2013 no longer accessible.	
Red Pillars	Tweed Heads-Gold Coast			Known as the Queensland–New South Wales state border sign, it is on the border, located on the Pacific Highway between Tweed Heads and Coolangatta.	
The Biggest Little Town	Mullumbimby		8×6 m (26×20 ft)	Located on the NSW far north coast just south of the QLD border in the shire of Byron, this town claims to be Australia's biggest little town.	

=== Northern Territory ===
Name	Location	Built	Size	Notes	Image
The Anmatjere Man	Anmatjere	2005		Located approx. 150 km north of Alice Springs at the Aileron roadhouse/caravan park. It is believed to be modelled on Charlie Quartpot Ngwarray who was an important Anmatyerr leader and rainmaker for the area. The Anmatjere Man took a year to construct and was created in 2005 by Mark Egan. Until 2008 the Anmatjere Man a.k.a. The BIG Aboriginal Hunter stood alone on top of a hill which is accessible for pictures in dry conditions.	
Anmatjere Woman and Child	Anmatjere	2008		In 2008 Mark Egan, creator of the Anmatjere Man, felt the sculpture needed a family and so begun sculpting the "Anmatjere Woman and Child". Anmatjere Woman and child is more accessible and situated just outside Aileron Roadhouse. A goanna was later added.	
Big Barramundi	Katherine			Located atop Rod & Rifle Tackleworld in Katherine NT	
Big Beer Can	Ghan			Ghan's boast of being the Northern Territory's First and Last stop for a drink resulted in this novelty reminder outside the Kulgera Pub. Originally the can label was West End Draught but a label change to XXXX Gold occurred sometime between 2002 and 2010	
Big Books	Alice Springs	2018		The Big Books were a part of a 2018 instalment to renovate and update the Alice Springs Public Library. Depicts several books by Nevil Shute, writer of A Town Like Alice.	
The Big Boxing Crocodile	Humpty Doo	1988	8×8 m (26×26 ft)	Located outside the United Petroleum station (formerly known as the Bush Shop) on the Arnhem Highway at Humpty Doo. The Boxing Crocodile was built by Ray Park in 1988 on a commission by Ray Whear and Marshall Brentnall who was the owner of The Bush Shop at that time. It was created to celebrate Australia winning the America's Cup in 1983 and to assist with attracting tourism to the area. The Boxing Crocodile is Humpty Doo's equivalent to the Boxing Kangaroo.	
Big Buffalo	Winnellie			Dubbed "Lefty" by locals as one testicle is visibly bigger than the other. Lefty was originally gray and created as a float for a local parade. Saved from being recycled by a local buffalo trading business, that purchased him as a company mascot but painted him pink to ensure he stood out from the gray business building he once stood proudly in front of. When the company closed its doors Lefty was auctioned and bought by the car dealership (Travans Cars & Commercials) where he resides to this day.	
The Big Dinosaur	Yarrawonga		13 m (43 ft)	This large fibreglass Brachiosaurus can be seen on Pierssene Rd, outside Bunnings Palmerston. It was previously a garden feature for 'Finlays Joint Cafe'. Originally bought by Tom Finlay, a stonemason, to complement a sculptured Dragon in Mr. Finlay's Landscaping supply section of his business. Mr. Finlay also purchased several other large dinosaurs made by the same Philippine-based Dutch company that produces models for adventure parks but began selling them in 2010.	
Big Fish	Wanguri			Visible from Gsell St; the Big Fish decorates the front yard of Wanguri Pre-School.	
Big Frogs	Darwin			Located outside Ramada Suites Zen Quarter Darwin. Originally located at Tom Finlay's 'Get Stoned' masonry but were purchased and relocated after Tom's masonry relocated themselves. The Big Frogs have a colourfully painted sister pair, located within the Berry Springs Wildlife Park.	
Big Gold Nugget	Douglas-Daly			The Big Gold Nugget is situated outside the Douglas Daly Historic Hotel and is a tribute to the gold once and still frequently found in the area.	
Big Hand	Alice Springs			The red sculpture situated outside 'Central Second Hand Shop' consists of a hand protruding another hand from its index finger	
The Giant Jumping Crocodile	Wak Wak	1984		Located in the carpark of The Original Adelaide River Queen Jumping Crocodile Cruises, just off the Arnhem Highway near the intersection of the Adelaide River.	
The Giant Jellyfish	East Point	2014	2.2 m (7 ft)	Created by artist Aly de Groot at a cost of $150,000, using a whimsical woven technique. The two jellyfish can be found by the water in Darwin's East Point Reserve.	
Big Owl	Darwin	2010		Created in 2010 by Koolpinyah Richard Barnes. Located outside the Darwin Supreme Court.	
The Big Stockwhip	Fly Creek		7×10 m (23×33 ft)	Depicts an Australian stockwhip, used for mustering cattle.	
The Big Stubbie	Larrimah			Depicts a NT Draught stubbie, a small beer bottle.	
Big Turtle	Lyons	2004	1.5×4 m (4.9×13.1 ft)	Commissioned to celebrate the new estate of Lyons, which was established in 2004. The giant sea turtle was created by Techy Masero with assistance from Larrakia Nation artists. Unofficially named 'Collin' by Google Maps editors.	
Big Wine Bottle	Daly Waters			The Big Wine bottle is fixed to the back of ute and typically parked at the Daly Waters Historic Pub.	

=== Queensland ===
Name	Location	Built	Size	Notes	Image
The Big Apple	Thulimbah	1978	4×4.5 m (13×15 ft)	Quoted from "Landmark Legends of Stanthorpe": "The original Big Apple, a Granny Smith, lived at the petrol station at Applethorpe from 1978. The steel and fibreglass sculpture stands 4m tall and the apple is 4.5m in diameter. It was crafted by local artisan Johnny Ross. It went into temporary retirement in 2003 when the Applethorpe site was redeveloped. After a brief facelift, the re-grafted apple emerged as a Royal Gala apple slightly north of town at Thulimbah. Its new home is Vincenzo's at the Big Apple, which is situated on the opposite side of the New England Highway to Suttons Apple Orchard & Cidery."	
Big Apple	Acacia Ridge			Located at 1102 Beaudesert Road	
Banana the Bullock	Banana			Dun bullock after which the Shire and Town of Banana were named.	
Big Banana	North Mackay	1987	9.2×1.8 m (30.2×5.9 ft)		
Big Bowling Pin	Maryborough	unknown, restored 2020		Previously from Toowoomba, The 'Big Bowling Pin' was restored and put on display again in 2020 out the front of Maryborough Tenpin Bowl, located at 2 Quarry Court, Maryborough	
Big Kronosaurus	Richmond			'Krono', a full sized replica of the Kronosaurus queenslandicus. Outside Kronosaurus Korner Fossil Museum, Richmond.	
Big Barrel	Bundaberg	2005	25×10 m (82×33 ft)	The Barrel is an interpretive visitor centre, gift shop, and bottle shop for Bundaberg Brewed Drinks, located at 147 Bargara Road. According to a commemorative plaque inside the Barrel, it was opened by Mark Vaile on 18 November 2005.	
The Big Barramundi	Normanton	1995	7×2 m (23.0×6.6 ft)		
The Big Barramundi	Daintree	1986	7.5×2 m (24.6×6.6 ft)		
Big Bolt and Nut	Roma			Located in front of Banks Bolts and Fastners at 87 Raglan Street.	
Big Boomerangs	Nindigully	1989	3 m (9.8 ft)	These 3 big boomerangs are what remain from the roof of the diner that was built on the site, and featured in the 1999 Australian film The Paperback Hero.	
The Big Boot / Shoe	Deagon	1960s		The boot originally came from a boot and footwear factory on the corner of Hale and Caxton Streets in Paddington, operated by the Morris family in 1960. In 1976, the factory became a restaurant called the Spaghetti Emporium, and the boot remained on the roof there until it was brought to a facility on the corner of Rode and Gympie Roads (621 Gympie Road) in the late 1970s as a marker for Boots Camping. The building, which had been occupied by a car dealership, was demolished in 2021 and the boot was relocated to its current location on Braun Street, Deagon.	
The Big Brolga	Townsville	1988		The Big Brolga was originally located at the Visitor Centre on the Bruce Highway, south of Townsville. It has been removed and is no longer displayed.	
Big Brolgas and Snake	Near Mackay				
Big Bulls	Rockhampton	1978		Initially there were two bull statues but over time others were added reaching a total of seven. Five of the bulls were created by sculptor Hugh Anderson.	
The Big Cane Toad	Sarina	1983	4×1 m (13.1×3.3 ft)	"Buffy", short for the cane toad's scientific name Bufo marinus, is located on Broad Street, Sarina. Originally built out of papier-mâché in 1983 for a float in the Apex Sugar Festival Parade, The Sarina Council later cast the Big Toad in fibreglass to become a permanent fixture in the town's centre.	
The Big Captain Cook	Cairns	1972	14×2 m (45.9×6.6 ft)	Built by Roberto Paiaro from Cairns. Originally had "Made in Japan" painted on the lower leg as a joke. Modelled on the explorer James Cook. The statue was taken down in May 2022.	
The Big Cassowary	Wongaling Beach		4×4 m (13×13 ft)	Statue of a cassowary on the south-east corner of Tully Mission Beach Road and Wongaling Beach Road (17.8975°S 146.0918°E). Built by Darryl Lourigan.	
The Big Cockatoo	Mossman			In front of the Mossman Hotel and Holiday Villas, 1–9 Alchera Drive (16.4702°S 145.3729°E).	
The Big Cow	Highfields	1976	12.0×7.6 m (39.4×25 ft)	Moved from Kulangoor on 10 January 2020 to Highfields Pioneer Village near Toowoomba. Officially reopened on 20 September 2020.	
The Big(Mud)Crab	Cardwell	1986	4×1 m (13.1×3.3 ft)	Built by Terry Tebble, senior preparator at the Queensland museum. Located at Seaview Cafe in Cardwell. The original mould is kept at NatureWorks, near Samford, QLD.	
Big Crab	Miriam Vale	1979		Located at the Shell petrol station and roadhouse on the corner of Dougall Street and Roe Street (Bruce Highway). Created by proprietor Lex Milner, who owned the service station at the time and wanted to promote his mud crab sandwiches.	
Big Crocodile	Daintree	2001	2×4 m (6.6×13.1 ft)		
Big Crocodile	Wangetti	1984	7.9×1 m (25.9×3.3 ft)	Also known as 'Big Ted', this Big Thing is at Hartley's Creek Adventures, a crocodile farm with over 3,000 crocodiles. Big Ted is a life-sized replica of one shot by Krys Pawlowski near Karumba in 1957.	
"Mr O’Doyle" the Crocodile in a Boat	St Lawrence, Queensland	2017	3.80 m (12.5 ft)	The "Mr. O'Doyle" crocodile is a popular roadside attraction in St Lawrence, Queensland. Built in 2017, this vibrant, smiling 3.8-meter replica sits by the general store and pays homage to the region's famous saltwater inhabitants, serving as a popular photo spot for travellers driving along the Bruce Highway.	
Big Crocodile	Normanton	1996	8.63 m (28.31 ft)	An accurate artist's impression of the largest recorded saltwater crocodile ever killed. "Krys the Savannah King" was shot in 1957 by Krystina Pawlowski on the banks of the Norman River.	
Big Deck Chair	Winton	2002	18.3 m (60.04 ft)	Located at the Royal Theatre, an open air picture show on Elderslie Street. The chair was donated in April 2005 by the Free Masons Taskforce Victoria. Claimed to be the World's largest, but claim has not been verified.	
The Big Dinosaur	Ballandean	1998	2.1×6.7 m (6.9×22.0 ft)	Also known as 'The Big Triceratops' or 'Fruitisforus', this large fibreglass Triceratops was originally used as a float in the 1998 Apple & Grape Festival. After the festival, residents placed it on the roadside to help sell fruit for a local fundraiser, and it became a popular landmark. The triceratops was refurbished in 2009 to repair weather damage and then returned to its original post in front of the Ballandean railway station.	
The Big Dugong	Rockhampton	1992	22×12 m (72×39 ft)	Located at the Rockhampton Dreamtime Cultural Centre.	
The Big Easel	Emerald	1999	25 m (82 ft)	The Big Easel, located off Capricorn Highway in Morton Park, holds a 7×10 m (23×33 ft) reproduction of one of Van Gogh's Sunflower paintings.	
The Big G	Gracemere	2015	5.4×6.6 m (18×22 ft)	Made from 6 mm (1/4 in) mild steel and weighing almost 5,000 kg (11,000 lb); marks the entry to Gracemere Industry Park.	
Big Golf Ball	Mermaid Beach	1970s		Located at the Mermaid Beach Putt Putt, which was established in 1969 as Australia's first miniature golf course on Hanlan Street at Surfers Paradise before relocating to Mermaid Beach in 1973. The structure was significantly damaged in 2025 as a result of strong winds from Tropical Cyclone Alfred.	
The Big Golden Gumboot	Tully	2003	8×6.1 m (26×20 ft)		
The Big Gun	Underwood			A 155 mm (6.1 in) field gun mounted on top of a two-story fruit shop. The gun was in a metal scrap yard that occupied the site in the 1960s before the shops and offices were built in the 1970s.	
The Big Hard Rock Guitar	Surfers Paradise	1996	10×3 m (32.8×9.8 ft)	Large guitar that fronts every Hard Rock Cafe. The Surfers Paradise location was established 22 March 1996.	
The Big Hose	Gallery of Modern Art, Brisbane	2025	119 m long	Created by artists Tony Albert and Nell	
The Big Macadamia Nut	Woombye, 5.5 kilometres (3.4 mi) south of Nambour	1978	16 m (52 ft)	Six years after the Big Pineapple opened the owners built the Big Macadamia nut. Once part of the "Nut Country Tour", the building was eventually converted to the "Rainforest Creatures of the Night" display in 2000. The building is now used as the entrance to the Treetop Challenge.	
Maddie and Mike	Southport	2010	2.5 m (8 ft)	This statue of seven-year-old Maddie and her teddy bear was created by Academy Award winner John Cox. Maddie and Mike can be found atop a small hill in the Broadwater Parklands.	
The Big Mandarin	Mundubbera	1983	11×15 m (36×49 ft)		
The Big Mango	Bowen	2002	10×8 m (33×26 ft)	The Big Mango stands at the tourist information centre in Bowen. In February 2014, the Mango was temporarily "stolen" by restaurant chain Nando's as a publicity stunt.	
Big Map of Australia	Goondiwindi	?	5×5 m (16×16 ft)	Made from pieces of old machinery and pipes. Located on the Inglewood side of Goondiwindi.	
The Big Marlin	Cairns	1980	10×2 m (32.8×6.6 ft)		
Matilda The Kangaroo	Kybong	1982	13 m (42.7 ft)	Built to be the mascot for the 1982 Commonwealth Games. Presently located at a Puma service centre near Traveston on the Bruce Highway, South of Gympie.	
Big Meat Ant	Augathella	2011	7.5 m (25 ft)	A giant meat ant sculpture commissioned by Murweh Shire Council in the hope of attracting "thousands of tourists".	
Big Melon	Chinchilla	2018	8 m (26 ft) long	In 2018, Chinchilla won a national competition run by Wotif to create a Next Big Thing as a tourist attraction. The melon was installed next to the town's information centre in November 2018.	
Big Merino	Blackall	1983	3×4 m (9.8×13.1 ft)		
The Big Miner	Rubyvale	1983		In front of the Bobby Dazzler mine. Missing its left hand in May 2012. Hand repaired and statue repainted prior to December 2012.	
The Big Mower	Beerwah	1974	11×3.6 m (36×12 ft)		
The Big Ned Kelly	Maryborough		7×2 m (23.0×6.6 ft)	The Big Ned Kelly stands in front of the Ned Kelly Motel and service station. Built by Dat Romano.	
The Big Orange	Gayndah	1977			
The Big Orange	Lockyer Valley			Corner of Lake Clarendon Way and Crowley Vale Road.	
The Big Paperclip	West End, Brisbane		3×2 m (9.8×6.6 ft)	This was a public sculpture that once stood on the lot next to Paul's dairy factory on Montague Road. The area is now part of the ramp onto the Go Between bridge, and the fate of the sculpture is unknown. Last photo located on the internet was dated 2007.	
The Big Peanut	Tolga	1977			
Big Peanut	Kingaroy	2021			
The Big Pelican	Noosaville			Mounted on a motorised float in parkland next to the Noosa River.	
The Big Pick, Shovel and Sieve	Sapphire	1999	4×2.5 m (13.1×8.2 ft)	Located in front of the Blue Gem Store Van Park. Built by Barry Richardson and David Gould.	
The Big Pie	Yatala	late 1970s	4.5 m (15 ft) diameter	Mounted atop a 10 m (33 ft) pole next to the car park of the Yatala Pies drive-through pie shop.	
Big Pineapple	Gympie	1971	16 m (52 ft) high	Formerly located next to a service station on the Bruce Highway, the Gympie Big Pineapple was demolished in 2008 during redevelopment of the site.	
The Big Pineapple	Woombye, 5.5 kilometres (3.4 mi) south of Nambour	1971	16×6 m (52×20 ft)	The Big Pineapple is a tourist attraction on the Sunshine Coast in South East Queensland, Australia. It is 16 metres high and is claimed to be the world's largest pineapple, gaining this title after a large pineapple-shaped water tower in Hawaii was dismantled in 1993 (see List of World's Largest Roadside Attractions). The pineapple was originally opened on 15 August 1971, and is situated on a 165-hectare site in Woombye.	
The Big Pumpkin	Beaudesert				
The Big Pumpkin	Gumlu			The Big Pumpkin is situated outside the same roadside fruit and vegetable store as the Big Watermelon.	
The Big Red Elephant	Hatton Vale			Located at 4138 Warrego Highway. Part of the "Jumbo" shopping centre.	
The Big Redback	Eight Mile Plains, Brisbane	1996	5×3 m (16.4×9.8 ft)	The Big Redback resided on the premises of Redback Landscaping at Eight Mile Plains. The business has since moved to Underwood and disassembled the Big Redback. Inquires have garnered that it is unlikely to be reassembled due to lack of space.	
The Big Rig	Roma		over 30 m (98 ft) tall	A tourist attraction which commemorates the finding of oil in Roma.	
The Big Rum Bottle	Bundaberg Haigslea	1988	7×1 m (23.0×3.3 ft)	Originally the Bundaberg Rum Company's pavilion at World Expo 88 in Brisbane, and is now located outside the visitor centre at the Bundaberg Distillery. Several copies of the bottle have been found in various locations throughout Queensland, with one still surviving outside of the Sundowner Saloon in Haigslea (2316 Warrego Highway, 27.5685°S 152.6220°E).	
The Big Sapphire	Anakie	1982	3.7×2.26 m (12.1×7.4 ft)	Located in front of the Big Sapphire and Gemfield Information Centre at 1 Anakie Road, which was closed as of May 2012.	
The Big Sapphire Ring	Sapphire	1984		Located in front of Pat's Gems. Built by Victor Saunders.	
The Big Sausage King	Centenary Heights, Toowoomba			The Big Sausage King sits on the roof of Gray's Modern Meat Mart in Centenary Heights. In 2010 it was stolen, and in spite of 10 kg (22 lb) sausage reward from the store and an additional $500 being offered by radio station Triple M, it was eleven months before it was discovered in a local quarry.	
The Big Scout Hat	Cairns	1982		The octagonal Cairns Control Room is listed on the Queensland Heritage Register. The fibreglass Scout hat was added to the building in 1982.	
The Big Shell	Tewantin	1960s	6×2 m (19.7×6.6 ft)	The Big Shell is the entrance to a Hawaiian / tropical lifestyle store. The Shell is now under the third owner.	
The Big Spanner	Sapphire	1982	2 m (6.6 ft)	The first big thing in the area of Rubyvale and Sapphire, and was built by Allen May.	
The Big Spray Gun	Toowoomba	2023		Made by Ando's Metalart in 2023? and installed out the front of the Paint 'n' Colour Business on Taylor Street.	
The Big Strawberry	Elimbah	2014	Over 5 m (16 ft) tall	Outside Rolin Farms, a strawberry and orchid farm on Rutters Road, Elimbah.	
The Big Stubby	Tewantin	1966	9×4 m (30×13 ft)	No longer there. Queensland's first big thing, built by George Clifford out of 17,000 empty stubby bottles.	
The Big Surveyors Tripod	Warwick, Queensland	2024	5m high approx	Styled on a Leica Geosystems branded tripod located outside a Cadastral Surveyors office on the New England Highway through town.	
Big Teepee	Millmerran	?	4 m (13 ft) high	The Big Teepee was erected reportedly as a Rendezvous Place for a local club.	
Big Thermometer	Stanthorpe	2018	10 m (33 ft)	"The coldest place in Queensland" has the Big Thermometer to proudly display the temperature.	Stanthorpe Big Thermometer with the Moon overhead
Big Thongs	Calen	2021	2.5 m (8.2 ft)		
Big Watermelon	Gumlu			The Big Watermelon is situated outside the same fruit and vegetable roadside store as the Big Pumpkin.	
The Big Whale	Kinka Beach			Built by Kevin Logan.	
William the Wombat	Thallon (28.6361°S 148.8690°E)	2018	2×3.5 m (6.6×11.5 ft)	The wombat depicted is a northern hairy-nosed wombat which is critically endangered.	
Yabby	Windorah	2026	4.6 m (15 ft)	Built from bird wire and sheet metal	

=== South Australia ===
Name	Location	Built	Size	Notes	Image
The Australian Farmer (also known as the Big Farmer)	Wudinna	2008	8 m (26 ft)	Taking 17 years to develop from the initial proposal to the final unveiling, the Australian Farmer, located in the Wudinna, was carved by artist Marijan Bekic and his son David between 2007 and 2009. Representing the early settlers of the region, the work stands at 8 m (26 ft) in height, and was carved out of approximately 70 tonnes (69 long tons; 77 short tons) of local granite.	
The Big Ant	Poochera	2008		Originally located at The Poochera Roadhouse on the Eyre Highway but the Roadhouse has closed and the Big Ant was relocated into the town park.	
The Big Bee	Kingscote				
The Big Blade	Snowtown				
The Big Bob-tail Lizard	Port Lincoln			Outside the Kuju Aboriginal Arts Centre, 30 Ravendale Road, Port Lincoln	
The Big Bull	Tapleys Hill Road, Royal Park			Located on top of the Hahndorf Gourmet Butchers	
The Big Cherries	Pages Flat, near Adelaide			Located at Fleurieu Cherries on Pages Flat Road (B34) in Pages Flat	
The Big Church Block Bottle	McLaren Vale	2010	10 m (33 ft)	The Big Church Block Bottle is no longer on display at the Wirra Wirra Winery, having been removed in 2016. The Big Church Block Bottle, named Our Work of Art, was a 10 m (33 ft) high replica bottle of Wirra Wirra, Church Block wine. The bottle was constructed to launch the Melbourne Food & Wine Festival in March 2010, located at Southbank in Melbourne. The bottle was located in Melbourne from 14 March 2010 through to 19 March 2010 before it was re-located to the Wirra Wirra vineyard in McLaren Vale, during April 2010. The bottle was designed in five sectional pieces, made from steel framework covered in wire mesh. The mesh has been cladded entirely by recycled corks. Each cork was individually drilled and threaded onto elastic before being cable tied around each section of the bottle.	
The Big Cockroach	Port Wakefield Road, Lower Light	1990s	4×4 m (13×13 ft) (approx.)	The Big Cockroach is part of the Port Wakefield road sculptures, and features a sign verifying its global size dominance. Located on private land and next to a highway. It was originally constructed in the 1990s, and was almost destroyed in 2013 but saved through public action and returned to the site.	
The Big Dice	Barrier Highway			The Big Dice consist of six concrete blocks piled into a small pyramid. They are located 24 km (15 mi) east of Yunta / 20 km (12 mi) west of Mannahill, just off the Barrier Highway at Cockscomb Creek	
The Big Dunlop Tyre	Sturt Highway, Yamba			The Big Dunlop Tyre is in Yamba at the Quarantine Inspection Centre, about 4 km from the South Australia and Victoria Border on the Sturt Hwy, an hour and a quarter drive west of Mildura.	
The Big Fish	Yalata	2026		Located at the Yalata Roadhouse, the 200-kilogram bronze mulloway sculpture was unveiled in 2026.	
The Big Galah	Kimba	1993	8×2.5 m (26×8 ft)	Residing at the "Halfway Across Australia Tourist Shop" at Kimba, the Big Galah was built from fibreglass over a steel frame by Robert Venning, and was opened in 1993. Modelled on the Galahs that frequent the region, it weighs in the vicinity of 2.3 tonnes (2.5 short tons).	
The Big Hat	Cradock	2013		Located opposite the Cradock Hotel.	
The Big Hills Hoist	O'Sullivan Beach; 35.11779°S 138.48429°E			Located next to the Orrcon Steel carpark, at the corner of Morrow Rd and O'Sullivan Beach Rd, in O'Sullivan Beach.	
The Big Kangaroo	Border Village	1986	5×2 m (16.4×6.6 ft)	Also known as "Rooey II", the Big Kangaroo can be found at Border Village in South Australia, located just shy of the border with West Australia. Made from papier-mâché and fibreglass over a steel frame, from a design by Bill Metheral, Rooey was intended to capitalise on traffic journeying to Perth for the America's Cup, and was opened in 1986.	
The Big Koala – Matilda	Gumeracha			Matilda The Big Koala – Located at 452 Torrens Valley Rd Gumeracha South Australia 5233	
The Big Lobster	Rosetown	1979	17×15×13 m (56×49×43 ft)	Known locally as "Larry", the Big Lobster was designed and built by Paul Kelly (who also designed the Big Scotsman) as a means of attracting attention to the visitor centre and restaurant at which it is located. It was built in six months out of a steel frame with a fibreglass shell. The size is incorrectly said to have been an error: the original plans were drawn in feet, but the designer misinterpreted them to be metres. The Specifications actually required the length to be ~12 metres long and it is a fraction longer than this.	
Map the Miner	Kapunda	1988	8×2 m (26.2×6.6 ft)	Named Map Kernow, the "son of Cornwall", Map the Miner represents the Cornish miners who once worked at the town of Kapunda. Standing at the southern end of the town, the work was built by Ben van Zetten and opened on 5 June 1988. The statue was destroyed by a fire in 2006, but has since been rebuilt.	
The Big Olive	Tailem Bend	2009	11 m (36 ft)	The Big Olive was constructed to attract tourists to The Big Olive processing plant and visitor centre. Located just outside Tailem Bend, it consists of two olives – one green and one black – which together stand at 8 metres (26 ft) and weigh over 1 t (2,200 lb). The olives were constructed out of fibreglass by The Newell Group, and were placed on the site in April 2005.	
The Big Orange	Berri	1980	15×12 m (49×39 ft)	Located in the South Australian Riverland, the Big Orange was designed by Adelaide-based architect John Twopenny. It is constructed with fiberglass panels covering a steel frame, with the entire structure weighing in the vicinity of 85 tonnes (84 long tons; 94 short tons). The structure consists of four levels, with a function room on the first floor, a souvenir shop and cafe on the second, a mural depicting the local scenery on the third, and a lookout on the fourth. The Big Orange closed in 2004, but may still be photographed from the road, and in 2023 plans were approved to redevelop the site while retaining the Big Orange as the centrepiece or the new development.	
The Big Oyster	Ceduna	1992		The Big Oyster was originally built as a float for Ceduna's annual Oysterfest. Built by Leon Veerhuis out of ferro-concrete, it was retired from parade duties in 1994. It is located next to an information booth on Eyre Highway just north of Ceduna.	
The Big Pelican	Loxton	1992		The Big Pelican was originally constructed as a float for a local Mardi Gras in 1979. After being employed for this purpose on a number of occasions, including once in Adelaide, the papier-mâché structure was remodelled, and, in 1992, it was overlaid with fibreglass. Today it can be found at the Loxton Caravan Park.	
Another Big Pelican	Meningie	2015		This Big Pelican was carved from a single tree. It includes depictions of a pelican as well as an Indigenous and a European child holding a fish together. It was created by Ants Redgum Gallery and unveiled in August 2015. It is located in Jubilee Park on the Princes Highway (B1). Due to significant decay the carved pelican was removed in 22 September. The new sculpture is under shelter of the verandah of The Chambers in the main street.	
The Big Pigeon	Rundle Mall, Adelaide	2020		The Big Pigeon is a mirrored stainless steel sculpture by South Australian artist Paul Sloan, installed in Rundle Mall Adelaide, on 6 November 2020. The pigeon is more than 2 metres tall, and cost $174,000.	
The Big Ram	Karoonda	2003	2×3 m (6.6×9.8 ft)	The Big Ram in Karoonda recognises the importance of the sheep industry in the region. Instigated by the Karoonda Development Group and located on the Railway Lawns, the Big Ram is 2 metres (6 ft 7 in) high and 3 metres (10 ft) long, and is built from concrete. It was completed in 2003.	
The Big Rocking Horse	Gumeracha	1981	18×17 m (59×56 ft)	Part of a complex that includes a wooden toy factory and a wildlife park, the Big Rocking Horse in the Adelaide Hills stands at over 18 metres tall and weighs more than 25 tonnes. Designed by David McIntosh and John Twopenny (the latter also designed The Big Orange), it took eight months to build at a cost of over $100,000. The steel structure incorporates three viewing platforms.	
The Big Santa (Father Christmas)	Adelaide	1960s	16.4×5×2.5 m (53.8×16.4×8.2 ft)	Father Christmas (the Big Santa) was installed on the front of retailer John Martin's in the lead-up to Christmas, and later those premises became David Jones. In 2015, the Big Santa was moved to Adelaide Central Market, after building changes in Rundle Mall removed the canopy he used to stand on. Currently appears at Christmas on the Market's red brick Grote Street tower, built in 1900. Weighs almost three tonnes.	
The Big Scotsman	Medindie, Adelaide	1963	5×1 m (16.4×3.3 ft)	The Big Scotsman, affectionately known as 'Scotty', was erected in December 1963 and thus predated the Big Banana by a year. Located at Scotty's Motel on the corner of Main North Road and Nottage Terrace in the inner-city suburb of Medindie, the Big Scotsman was designed by Paul Kelly, who later went on to build the Big Lobster. Materials: Steel frame, polystyrene foam, fibreglass outer	
The Big Spriggina floundersi	Arkaroola; 30°18′55.3″S 139°19′01.4″E			Spriggina floundersi is a flatworm from the Ediacaran period, and is the fossil emblem of South Australia. Named after Reg Sprigg who both discovered the Ediacaran biota and also converted Arkaroola from an agricultural property into a wilderness sanctuary. A giant landscape model has been constructed in a valley on the property and is visible from the Mawson-Spriggina walking trail.	
The Big Teddy Bear	Minlaton		4×3 m (13.1×9.8 ft)	The Teddy Bear is constructed from round and square hay bales, and is located 7 kilometres north of Minlaton at 20006 Spencer Hwy, Koolywurtie.	
The Big Winch	Coober Pedy	1986	8×5 m (26×16 ft)	The Big Winch acknowledges Coober Pedy's opal-mining industry. Built by Klaus Wirries in the 1970s, the original Big Winch was destroyed in 1986 and rebuilt shortly thereafter.	
The Big Windmill	Penong			The windmill museum includes the largest windmill in Australia.	
The Big Wombat	Bookabie			Situated at Scotdesco Aboriginal Community (Tjilkaba), on the Eyre Highway.	
The Big Yabby	Clayton	1973	2 m (6.6 ft)	Built in 1973 by Henry Jones, the Big Yabby resides at the Murray River town of Clayton, and originally sat outside his family's Yabby City Restaurant. While the concrete yabby remains, the restaurant has since changed both owners and name to become Sails at Clayton, and yabbies are no longer on the menu. As of 2015, the Yabby is no longer there. The Big Yabby now resides next to a private house in Clayton Bay and can be seen from the street in 2020.	
The Big Fly Swat	Kingoonya	2026	8m long (about one Stobie pole high)	https://www.abc.net.au/news/2026-11-14/worlds-biggest-fly-swat-in-outback-kingoonya-sa/107314740	

=== Tasmania ===
Name	Location	Built	Size	Notes	Image
Big Apple	Spreyton				
Doug The Big Truffle Dog	Deloraine	2024	2.5 m height	Doug The Big Truffle Dog commemorates chief truffle hunter 'Douglas', a golden Labrador. Built by Gravelly Beach Metalworks,	
The Big Axe	Longley			At the Longley International Hotel 1678 Huon Rd, Longley TAS 7150	
The Big Beer Can	Launceston			At the James Boags Brewery 39 William St, Launceston	
The Big Blue Seal	Eaglehawk Neck			Located on awning of the Blue Seal Seafood Shack 5131 Arthur Hwy, Eaglehawk Neck, Tasmania 7179	
The Big Cherry	Latrobe			Formerly located at The Cherry Shed adjacent to the Bass Highway. The business closed in 2021 and the cherry has since been removed.	
The Big Coffee Pot	Deloraine			Constructed by the addition of a spout and handle to a grain silo.	
The Big Flywheel	Beaconsfield			The Big Flywheel on West St Beaconsfield	
The Big Frog	Bicheno			At The Pondering Frog 16494 Tasman Hwy, Bicheno Tas 7215	
The Big Honey Bee	Huonville			The Big Honey Bee at The Honey Pot 2273B Huon Hwy, Huonville TAS 7109	
The Big Rock Lobster	Stanley			Mounted on the roof of Hursey Seafoods.	
The Big Log	Campbell Town			89 High St, Campbell Town TAS 7210	
The Big Nut and Bolt	Launceston			At the Nuts and Bolt Tasmania store. 60 Frederick St, Launceston TAS 7250	
The Big Hazelnuts	Hagley			The Big Hazelnuts 127 Hagley Station Ln, Hagley TAS 7292	
The Big Penguin	Penguin	1975	3×1 m (9.8×3.3 ft)	Constructed from fibro cement to mark the centenary of the proclamation of the township of Penguin. Unveiled 25 October 1975.	
The Big Photo Frame	Stanley	2019		Stanley and Tarkin Photo Frame 148 Dovecote Rd, Stanley TAS 7331	
The Big Pitchfork	Huntingfield			Located at the Mitre 10 Trade Centre at 10 Huntingfield Ave, Huntingfield.	
The Big Platypus	Latrobe				
The Big Raspberry	Westerway			Located at the Westerway Raspberry Farm 1488 Gordon River Rd, Westerway TAS	
The Big Slide Rule	University of Tasmania, Hobart			Located in the School of Mathematics and Physics.	
The Big Spud	Sassafras				
The Big Tasmanian Devil	Mole Creek		2×3 m (6.6×9.8 ft)	Standing at the entrance to the Trowunna Wildlife park and Tasmanian Devil research centre.	
The Big Tasmanian Tiger	Mole Creek			At The Mole Creek Hotel 90 Pioneer Dr., Mole Creek TAS 7304	
The Big Thumbs Up	Scottsdale			Carved by Scottsdale resident Joshie Janoschka from the trunk of a fallen tree and donated to the town.	
The Big Trout	Cressy		6m	Cnr Main and Church St, Cressy	
The Big Wickets	Westbury		3×8 m (9.8×26.2 ft)	Located at the front of the local cricket pitch, commemorating locally born player Jack Badcock.	
The Big Yellow Motorcycle	Montumana			Poverty Gully 18469 Bass Hwy, Montumana	

=== Victoria ===
Name	Location	Built	Size	Notes	Image
Big Apple	Bacchus Marsh			The Apple was removed from display at the road side when the adjacent fruit shop closed down. It used to sit behind a fence next to a skip, but it was later removed. A replacement concrete version is smaller.	The Big Apple, Bacchus Marsh, VIC
The Big Apple	Gladysdale			The fibreglass Big Apple hangs from a pole outside the Gladysdale Primary School, which is the home of the annual Gladysdale Apple and Wine Festival. After sustaining damage from vandals, it was restored by a local builder and aircraft engineer The Apple is restored and hanging up as of 31 March 2024.	
Big Bowls Ball	Belmont			Belmont Bowls Club	
The Big Brake Shoes	Smiths Gully	1957–1958		Built at the PBR factory in East Bentleigh, and first installed at the Templestowe Hillclimb in 1958. Dismantled in 1987, restored by the MG Car Club Victoria 2007 to 2009, and erected at the Rob Roy Hillclimb in Smiths Gully on 18 November 2009	
The Big Brussels Sprout	Coldstream			Located at Adams Farm, 681 Maroondah Hwy, Coldstream VIC 3770	The Big Brussels Sprout in 2026.
The Giant's Chair	Mount Dandenong			Located at the Sky High Mount Dandenong lookout. Downstairs from the main restaurant, in the open grassed area	
Big Cherry	Wyuna			Located in the car park down the driveway	
The Big Cherry	Glenrowan			Owners of the property removed the Big Cherry in 2010/11.	
The Big Chess Piece	Kings Park, Upper Ferntree Gully			Giant king chess piece as per the name of the park. Next to the main football oval.	
The Big Chook	Myrtlebank			At the Myrlebank Roaming Farms, called Chickaletta. Made from rusted bike parts and corrugated iron. 1030 Maffra-Sale Rd, Myrtlebank VIC 3851	
Big Cigar	Churchill			Replica of Sir Winston Churchill's cigar, after whom the town is named.	
Big Coffee Cup	Rowville			Located at United Petroleum Fuel Station 1215 Stud Rd, Rowville VIC 3178 The corner of Stud Rd and Bergins Rd	☢
Big Coffee Maker	Brunswick		3×1 m (9.8×3.3 ft)	Located outside Georges Gourmet Coffee, 340 Victoria Street, Brunswick, Melbourne. Modelled after the Moka pot.	
Big Cows	Newhaven			The Big Cows are located outside the Phillip Island Chocolate Factory.	
Big Dead Fish	Fish Creek			Positioned on the roof of the Fishy Pub.	
Fairfield Industrial Dog Object (FIDO)	Fairfield	2000		Created in 2000 and positioned next to Fairfield railway station.	
The Big Dolphin Fish	Tooradin			Located near a footbridge in Sawtells Inlet. Originally a prop for the 2006 Commonwealth Games and placed in Tooradin by the local tourism group. 80 S Gippsland Hwy, Tooradin VIC 3980	☢
The Big Elf	Anakie			Part of Fairy Park.	
The Big Emus	Strathfieldsaye			A unique metal sculpture of Emus located at the Imagine Estate – Emu Garden At the corner of Swanson Bvd and Kiwarra Crt, Strathfieldlsaye Vic 3551	
Big Ernie	Shepparton			Ernie The Big Tractor Salesman Located at Konigs Shepparton. 355 Midland Highway – Shepparton Victoria.	
The Big Eyed Scad	Edenhope			Located at Lions Park. One of seventy-two large aquatic sea creatures created by MotherWorks for the opening ceremony of the 2006 Commonwealth Games. For every country that competed in the Games an aquatic sea creature, native to that country was created and floated across 36 barges down the Yarra River in an amazing sound and light display	
The Big Fish - Nassau Grouper	Donald			At the corner of Byrne St and Blair St Donal at the Bullocks Head Tree. Another of the Commponwealth Games 2006 fish scultures.	
The Big Fish Windvane	Fish Creek			The Big Wind Fish. 1 of 72 sculptures from the 2006 Commonwealth Games. 7 Falls Rd, Fish Creek VIC 3959	
Big Forks and Potatoes	On Princes Highway between Trafalgar and Yarragon			Located at 'The Spud Shed' – organic food shop at the corner of Princes Hwy and Rankins Rd	
Big Golf Ball	Clayton South			Located at the Spring Valley Golf Club, Heatherton Rd, Clayton South	
The Big Golf Ball	Heatherton			Located near to Kingston Heath Golf Club.	
Big Koala	Cowes			The Big Koala can be found next to Rusty Water Brewery and Restaurant on Phillip Island Road.	
The Giant Koala	Dadswells Bridge	1989	14×8 m (46×26 ft)	The Giant Koala is 27 km (17 mi) north-west of Stawell in the small township of Dadswells Bridge. The Koala is 14 m (46 ft) high, and weighs 12 tonnes (12 long tons; 13 short tons). It is made of bronze set on a steel frame. The sculptor is Mr Ben Van Zetton who was hired in 1988 to design and construct the piece. In 2009 it was renamed Sam to commemorate a koala rescued from bush fires.	
The Big KFC Bucket	Shepparton			The Big KFC Bucket on Doyles Rd, Shepparton	
Big Kookaburra	Donald	2025	5.5 m (18 ft)	The Big Kookaburra is on an industrial estate. It is made of steel and perched on a steel tree stump. The sculptor is Mr Chris Fussell who was hired in 2023 to design and construct the piece after a crowd funding campaign by local residents, with support from cookie factory suppliers. The Kookaburra was placed at the site of Kookas Country Cookies' new factory on 14 April 2025.	
Big Lizard	Marysville			The Big Blue-Tongued Lizard takes pride of place in Gallipoli Park, Marysville	
Big Lizzie	Red Cliffs	1915–1916	10.36×3.35×5.49 m (34.0×11.0×18.0 ft)		Big Lizzie, Red Cliffs, Victoria
The Big Lyrebird	Cann River			Located at The Cann River Community and Information Centre, 13 Princes Hwy	
The Big Magpie	Euroa			Located at Seven Creeks Park at the Kirkland Ave end. Its proper name is 'Swoop' The Big Barrwarrang.	
Big Mallee Bull	Birchip				
Big Mallee Fowl	Patchewollock	2013		The Big Mallee Fowl consists of two corrugated iron Mallee Fowl sculptures which were installed by artist Phil Rigg in 2013. They are located on the grounds of the old railway yards on Federation Street (opposite the hotel).	
Big Mallee Root	Ouyen			The Big Mallee Root is an actual mallee root rather than an oversized replica like most of Australia's big things. It is on display in a park.	
The Big Mandarin	Shepparton			A big Mandarin located at a fruit farm – 435 Midland Hwy, Shepparton East VIC 3631 At the corner of Midland Hwy and Orrvale Rd	
Big Miner	Warrenheip	opened 1 December 2006		Located at Gold Rush Golf on the Western Highway (M8) on the eastern side of Ballarat with the Big Ned Kelly. "The Big Miner stands as a tribute to the tens of thousands of gold prospectors who frequented regional Victoria during the second half of the nineteenth century. The statue stands 8 meters tall (6 meters of statue on a 2-metre base). It has been hand sculptured from polystyrene and has a 1.5 ton steel frame. The 2-metre high concrete base is approximately 15 tons. It was designed by Wayne Johnston of 3D Theme Concepts and sculptured by Steve Bristow. Ballarat Mayor, David Vendy, officially unveiled the statue on 1 December 2006."	
Big Mouth	St Kilda	1912		Luna Park, Melbourne 18 Lower Esplanade, St Kilda VIC 3182	
The Big Murray Cod	Arcadia			Located at the Arcadia Native Fish Hatchery, 20 mins south of Shepparton 200 Ross Road, Arcadia VIC 3631	
Giant Murray Cod	Swan Hill		3×9 m (9.8×29.5 ft)	Located at Swan Hill railway station.	
Big Ned Kelly (Warrenheip)	Warrenheip			Located at Gold Rush Golf on the Western Highway (M8) on the eastern side of Ballarat with the Big Miner.	
Big Ned Kelly (Glenrowan)	Glenrowan		6×2 m (19.7×6.6 ft)	A tribute to the bushranger Ned Kelly.	
Big Parrot	Strathmerton			The Big Superb Parrot located at the post office and Mail Box Cafe, 1 Maquire St, Strathmerton	
The Big Pheasant	Tynong		8×17 m (26×56 ft)	The Big Pheasant sits at the entrance to Gumbuya Park. It was the victim of an attack by a vandal in October 2011, suffering $50,000 of damage, and was restored to its previous condition within six months.	
Giant Pocket Watch	Melbourne			Located in the atrium of Melbourne Central Shopping Centre opposite the Coop's Shot Tower.	Giant pocket watch
The Big Pram	Eaglehawk			The Big Pram is on the roof of Helens Baby Wear Store in Eaglehawk, Bendigo.	
Public Purse	Melbourne			Located at the North-West end of the Bourke Street Mall outside the GPO.	
The World's Largest Rolling Pin	Wodonga			The Big Rolling Pin sits atop a bakery and spins. Located at 57 Hovell St.	
The Big Rosella	Cobram			In Federation Park, Punt Rd, at the Murray Valley Hwy	
Big Seat	Arthurs Seat	1989	1.4m – 1.8m	This chair was positioned on 1 December 1989 in an effort to maintain tradition. Its two predecessors both lost in history also accommodated many an important backside. Donated by Arthurs Seat Scenic Chairlift KC Metal Products	
The Big Shovel	Chiltern			A large artwork depicting a shovel. Located just north of the Hume Fwy exit to Chiltern	
Big Smoke, also known as the Big Cigarette	Myrtleford			No longer painted as the 'Big Smoke' due to closure of cigarette factory, located on Myrtleford–Yackandandah Road	
The Big Sphinx	North Geelong	1998	15 m tall	Technically not a "Big Thing" as it is substantially smaller than the item it is modelled on, the Great Sphinx of Giza.	
Big Strawberry	Koonoomoo		2×4 m (6.6×13.1 ft)	Located at the Big Strawberry store on the corner of Goulburn Valley Hwy and Cobram-Koonoomoo Rd.	
The Big Story Teller	Dederang			Located at the Dederang Hotel, 4326 Kiewa Valley Highway, Dederang VIC 3691	
The Big Sultana	Mildura	2026	5.25 m tall	Located at Mildura's waterfront precinct	
Big Tap	Cowes			The Big Tap suspended in the air above A Maze'N Things on Phillip Island Road.	
Big Trout	Harrietville			At the Stoney Creek Fish Farm, 10 Stony Creek Road	
The Big Turtle Guardian	East Ringwood	2026	2.5 meters wide	The "big Turtle Guardian", a prominent 2.5m long bronze sculpture of an Eastern long-necked turtle. You find it at the entrance of the newly rebuilt Ringwood East Station on Railway Avenue, Ringwood East. It was created by local artist Katie Stackhouse to serve as a symbolic protector for travelers.	
Big Water Cart	Shepparton			Located at the MOVE – Museum of Vehicle Evolution 7723 Goulburn Valley Hwy, Kialla VIC 3631	
The Big Watermelon	Wantirna South			1161 High St Rd	
Big Wave	Newhaven			A popular photo point, at the Island Surf Experience, Phillip Island Road, Newhaven.	
The Big Wheelbarrow	Clyde			Located at 26 Aintree Close, Clyde.	
Big Wine Bottle	45 Campbell Street, Rutherglen			The Wine Bottle was the town's original water tower in the 1900s. The tower became a backup supply once the new reservoir was constructed in 1945. The mesh top section was erected in December 1969 with funds from the Rutherglen Wine Festival, and from a distance gives the effect of a large wine bottle.	
Big Wool Bales	Hamilton	1989	3×12 m (9.8×39.4 ft)	The cafe and souvenir shop within the Big Wool Bales closed in June 2013 due to a lack of profit. The bales were demolished in 2020 due to termite damage.	
The Giant Worm	Bass		250×4 m (820×13 ft)	Formerly located on the Bass Highway, the Giant Worm was built to celebrate the Gippsland Giant Earthworm in 1985 and sold in 2000 to the present owner. It contained interactive displays. Closed to the public since 2010 and covered in graffiti. Demolished in December 2020. It was also home to Rosie the Shark, which has now been relocated to a Gem Museum in Devon Meadows.	

=== Western Australia ===
Name	Location	Built	Size	Notes	Image
Big Apple	Donnybrook		7×4 m (23×13 ft)		
Big Banana	Carnarvon		6×1 m (19.7×3.3 ft)	Cnr Robinson St & Boundary Rd	
Bert Bolle Barometer	Denmark	1985	Over 12.5 m (41 ft)	A working water barometer being the largest barometer in the world, recognised by the Guinness Book of Records. Built in the Netherlands by Bert Bolle and donated to the community of Denmark in 2007. The barometer was considered a monument and carried the name 'The Bert Bolle Barometer'. It was set up in The Barometer Tower in the Denmark Visitor Centre, but was removed in 2011.	
World's Tallest Bin	Kalgoorlie	1980	About 8 m (26 ft) tall	Created for an anti-littering campaign. Located at the top end of Hannan Street opposite the Federal Hotel	
Big Bobtail	Stirk Street, Kalamunda, Perth	2012	9×1.3 m (29.5×4.3 ft)	Carved out of rammed earth by Yagan memorial artist Roman Antoniuk, and modelled on a 300 mm (11.8 in) blue-tongued skink that lives on the block.	
The Big Camera	Meckering 31.63167°S 117.0071°E			A building housing a museum of photography and a collection of over 3000 cameras. Claimed by the Shire of Cunderdin to have the largest collection of working cameras in the southern hemisphere.	
Big Carnabys Sculpture	Apex Park, Moora 30.639°S 116.004°E	2026	11.5 metres (38 ft)	Two Carnaby's black cockatoos perched on a branch	
The Big Cricket Bat	Narrikup			The 8-metre-tall (26 ft) bat was constructed by Tony Poad, who has revived the local general store into not only a thriving mixed business, but also a cricketing museum. Although the museum is located at the general store, the Big Cricket Bat is situated at the local cricket ground. Accompanying the Bat is the world's first known cricket oval cricket bat fence, which is essentially the boundary picket fence with the top and bottom rails made out of normal planks and the vertical pickets are cricket bats. The fence is currently unfinished and it is assessed that the builders (who are on the local cricket team and led by Tony Poad) need approximately 2,000 more bats to complete the project.	
The Big Crocodile	Wyndham -15.4874, 128.12385	1987	18×3 m (59.1×9.8 ft)		
The Big Humpty Dumpty	Carnarvon			Constructed from strong Swedish steel previously used in the whaling industry. First situated at East Carnarvon, as a cyclone shelter. Soon relocated to an abandoned fruit farm on "The Fruit Loop" road at Carnarvon's outskirts, and painted to resemble Humpty Dumpty. Repainted in early 2026.	
King Neptune	Two Rocks, Yanchep	1982		Heritage-listed (2006). Originally built for Atlantis Marine Park.	
The Big Lobster	Dongara	2005		Corner of the Brand Highway & Moreton Terrace	
The Big Lollipop	Ravensthorpe			Situated at the 'Yummylicious Candy Shack' lolly shop at 89 Morgans St, Ravensthorpe, WA. Also home to some big Liquorice allsorts.	
The Big Marron	The Capel Marron Farm, 313 Goodwood Road, Capel WA 6271			Known as "Rex of the River", based on the local species of freshwater crayfish, the Cherax tenuimanus. The Big Marron is located Capel Marron Farm, between Capel and Donnybrook.	
The Big Mushroom	Balingup -33.78859, 115.97637			Situated in the gardens of the Old Cheese Factory, Nannup Road, Balingup.	
Big Orange	Harvey -33.06318, 115.89183		2 m (6.6 ft) diameter		
Big Periodic Table	Joondalup	2019	600 m^{2} (6,500 ft^{2})	The world's largest permanent periodic table of the elements can be found on the side of the five storey science building (Building 15) at Edith Cowan University and can be viewed from a smaller periodic table picnic table nearby. The periodic table is more than 4 times larger than the previous largest at the University of Murcia in Spain. It was inaugurated to coincide with the 150th anniversary of the table's creation by Russian chemist Dmitri Mendeleev.	
The Big Prawn	Exmouth	2005	7 m high (weights 2000 kg)	Situated outside the Exmouth Cultural Arts Centre.	
The Giant Ram	Wagin	1985	13×9×6 m (43×30×20 ft)	The second tallest ram statue in Australia, and the only one with anatomically correct genitalia, he is named Bart and situated at Wetlands Park. In May 2025, he hosted a party attended by Bluey and many others to celebrate his 40th birthday.	
Big Tractor	Carnamah	2024	11.5 m (38 ft) high, 16 m (52 ft) long	A replica of a Chamberlain 40K, it is the largest tractor sculpture in the world. Situated in Yarra Street, it is five times the size of its prototype, so big that it is visible from 2 km (1.2 mi) out of town.	
The Big Leeuwin Way Whale	Eucla		10×3 m (32.8×9.8 ft)	Situated in the carpark of the Eucla roadhouse, Eyre Highway.	
The Big Whale Shark	Exmouth	2002		This is situated on Murat Road next to the petrol station.	
The Big Wheelbarrow	Port Hedland			Situated at the entrance to the Wedgefield Industrial Area between Port Hedland and South Hedland.	
World's Largest Wooden Pendulum Clock	Nannup	2019	Over 6 m (20 ft)	The world's largest wooden pendulum clock. Built in the Nannup by Kevin Bird and housed in a purpose-built tower it opened to the public as a tourist attraction in January 2019. Made out of local timber Jarrah and Sheoak. The clock was removed in May 2019; only the building remains.	
Fergus the Bull	Forrest Highway, just north of Bunbury	23 December 2002	4 m	A 4 m wooden carved cross legged bull, resting its chin on its left hoof and holding a wine goblet in its right hoof. Fergus is the mascot for Ferguson Valley, an area in Dardanup.	
Wardandi Boodja	Koombana Drive, Bunbury	February 2019	5 m high, 6 m wide	Representing a Noongar face Artists: Alex and Nicole Mickle, and engineer Mike Kimble. Took 1 year to make.	
The Big Peg	Bridgetown, Western Australia	November 2018		Situated at the entrance when you drive into Bridgetown. Made by the artists Bridgetown's Grumpy Old Men Inc.	☢

== In popular culture ==
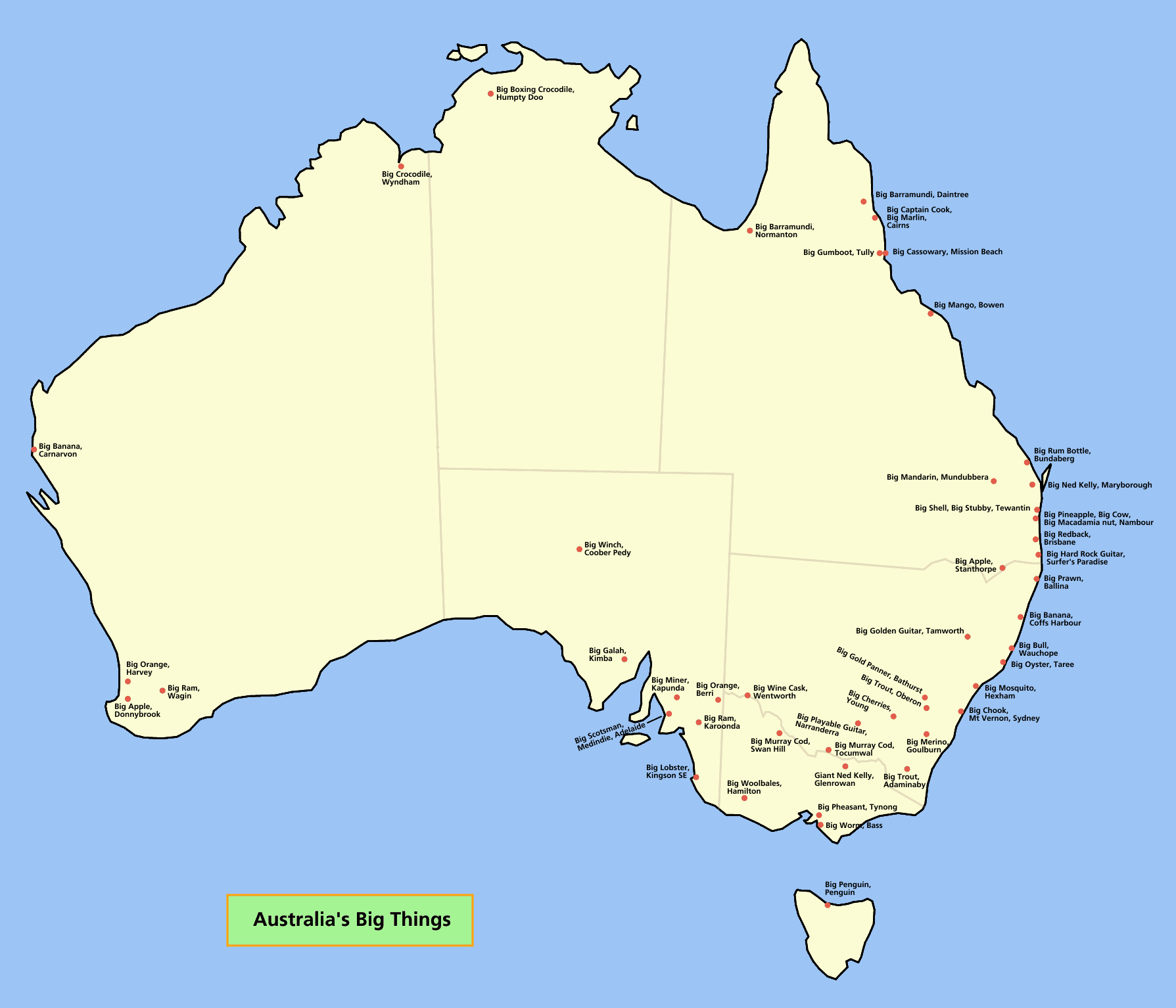
Locations of a number of Australia's big things

- The London production of Priscilla, Queen of the Desert: the Musical references the Big Prawn, Big Merino, Big Pineapple and the Big Banana.
- The ABC produced a documentary titled Big Things as part of its program The Big Picture.
- The National Museum in Canberra has a comprehensive multimedia exhibit displaying numerous big things.
- In 2007 Australia Post issued a set of 50c postage stamps by Reg Mombassa, commemorating five of the most iconic big things:
  - The Big Banana at Coffs Harbour (NSW)
  - The Big Golden Guitar at Tamworth (NSW)
  - The Big Lobster at Kingston SE (SA)
  - The Big Merino at Goulburn (NSW)
  - The Big Pineapple at Nambour (QLD)
- Danny Wallace mentions Australia's big things in his book Yes Man
- Travel writer Bill Bryson details his visit to the Big Lobster and the Big Bull in his book Down Under / In a Sunburned Country
- In the Australian comedy film Young Einstein, when the titular character books into a hotel, the desk clerk asks if he's "Here to see the Big Bed?"
- English stand-up comedian Ross Noble visited many of Australia's big things during his 2009 tour Ross Noble's Australian Trip.
- Australian comedians the Listies categorise Australia's big things in their comedy dictionary, Ickypedia, as "Enbigenating".
- The Big Pineapple appears in TY the Tasmanian Tiger 2: Bush Rescue
- In 2004, the Foxtel channel TV1 aired the ASTRA Award-winning production Magda's Big Things hosted by Magda Szubanski between commercial programming, in which Szubanski would visit a Big Thing and provide comedic, but often fictional commentary
- In 2022, Australian confectionary brand Allen's released a gummy lolly mix called Big Aussie Road Trip containing 5 gummy sweets inspired by the Big Things.
- In 2023, Melbourne punk band Private Function released their third album 370HSSV 0773H. The album cover included a scratchcard competition to win $2999, a test pressing of the album and the winner's face on all future pressings of the album if all three scratchcard pictures matched. The scratchcard pictures included photos of the Big Banana and the Big Koala.
- In 2023, the Royal Australian Mint released a set of commemorative $1 coins featuring ten of the "big things".
- In 2023, five of the sculptures were used to illustrate Australian $1.20 stamps.

== See also ==
- Dunedoo, New South Wales, which decided against "The Big Dunny"
- Giants of the Prairies
- List of largest roadside attractions
- New Zealand's big things
- Novelty architecture
