= Rotaract =

Youth organization of Rotary International

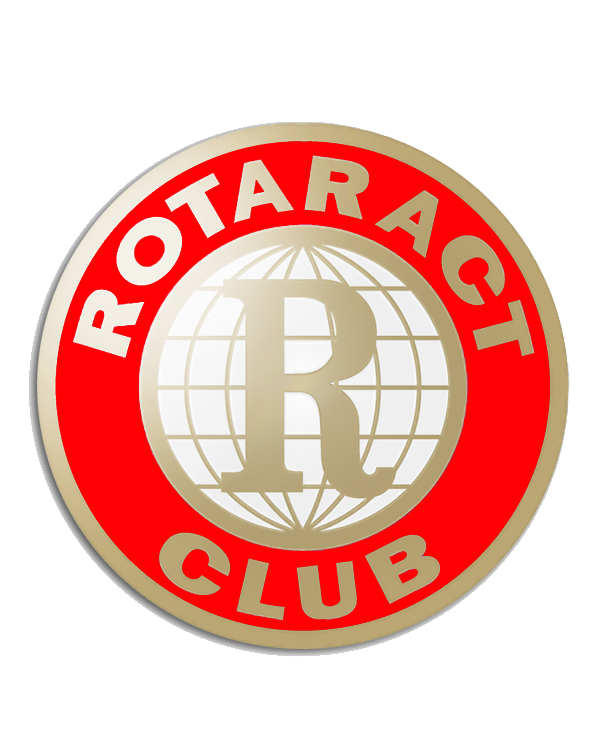
- one version of the logo
- Formation: March 13, 1968
- Purpose: Service
- Headquarters: Evanston, Illinois, U.S.
- Location: Global
- Origins: Rotary International
- Region served: Worldwide
- Members: ~120,000
- Website: rotary.org/rotaract

Rotaract originally began as a Rotary International youth program in 1968 at Charlotte North Rotary Club in Charlotte, North Carolina, United States.

== History ==
"Rotaract" stands for "Rotary in Action". The idea began on 13 March in North Carolina in 1968. Other clubs were formed. In 1977 The Big Pelican was built for one club in Queensland and it became a local landmark.

By 2024 it was an organisation of ~9,000 clubs and ~ 120,000 members in 189 countries and geographic areas. It is a service, leadership, professional, and community service organisation for young adults aged 18 and over.

In 2019, Rotaract went from being a program of Rotary International to being a membership type of Rotary International, elevating each club's status to that of Rotary clubs. As of 1 July 2020, Rotaract clubs can exist on their own or be sponsored by Rotary clubs. This makes them "partners in service" and members of the Rotary family. A Rotaract club may, but is not required to, establish upper age limits and record them in the club's bylaws.

== Approach ==
Rotaract focuses on young adults' development as leaders. Clubs take part in international service projects to bring peace and international understanding.

Activities take place at the club level. Rotaract clubs hold formal meetings in person or virtually, usually every two weeks, that feature speakers, outings, social activities, discussions and visits to other clubs. Club members get together for service project work, social events, or professional/leadership development workshops.

Potential members must be at least 18 years old and demonstrate a commitment to Rotaract's mission, along with a standing in their community.

Service includes Club Service, Community Service, International Service and Professional Development.

== Countries ==
In 2012 there were twenty clubs in Ghana celebrating 44 years of Rotoract.

== Multidistrict communication and MDIOs ==
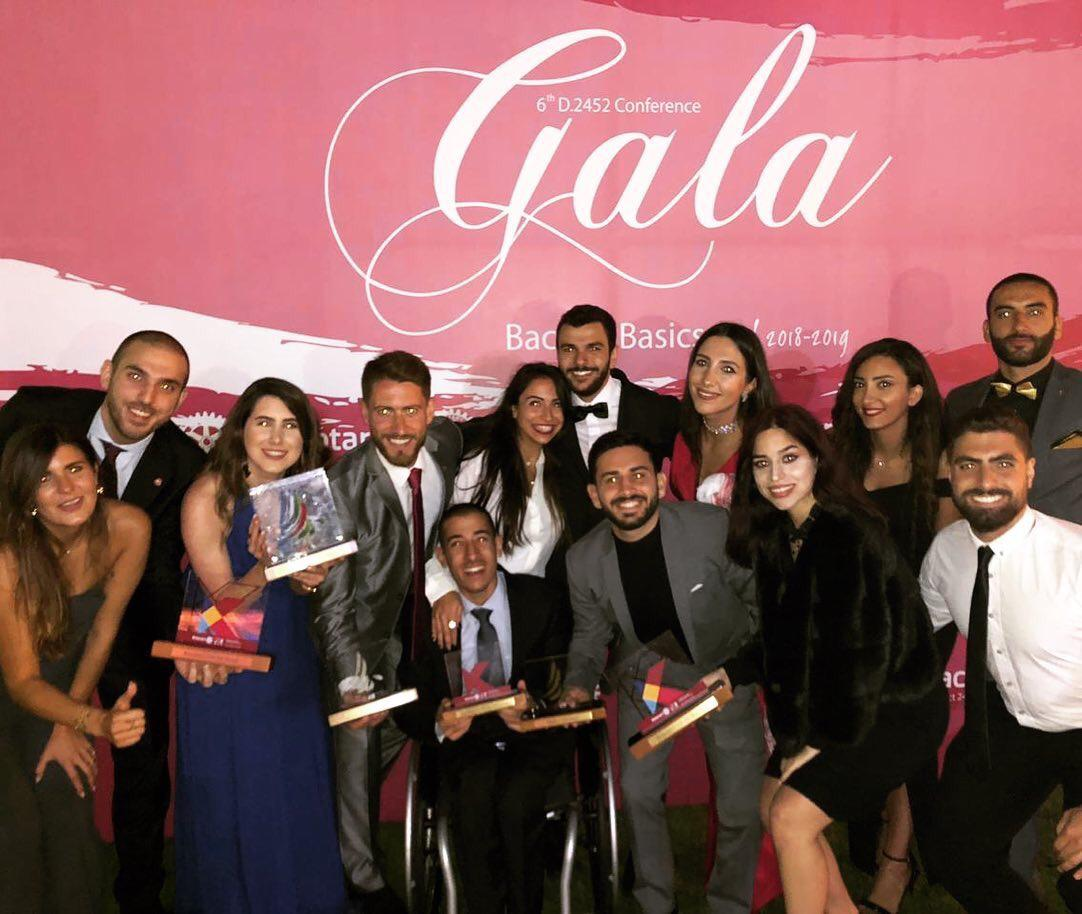
Rotaract Club de Beyrouth members during the Gala Dinner of the 6th Rotaract District 2452 conference.

Rotaract multidistrict information organizations (MDIOs) function as regional resource centers for Rotaractors. They comprise Rotaract clubs in two or more districts either within a country or across several countries.

Rotaract MDIOs are directly responsible for getting Rotaractors ready to be leaders, and they keep everyone up to date on program news, local and international news, and event news. They also help bring together people from different clubs and districts in a certain area.
