= Nicole Pratt =

Australian tennis player

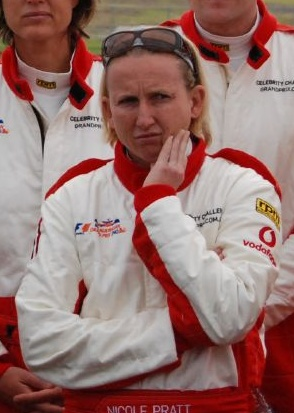
- Pratt in 2008
- Country (sports): Australia
- Residence: Orlando, Florida, U.S.
- Born: 5 March 1973 (age 53) Mackay, Queensland, Australia
- Height: 1.63 m (5 ft 4 in)
- Turned pro: 1989
- Retired: 2008
- Plays: Right-handed (one-handed backhand)
- Prize money: $2,404,645

Singles
- Career record: 456–441
- Career titles: 1
- Highest ranking: No. 35 (17 June 2002)

Grand Slam singles results
- Australian Open: 4R (2003)
- French Open: 2R (1998, 2001, 2002, 2004, 2007)
- Wimbledon: 3R (2006)
- US Open: 3R (2003)

Doubles
- Career record: 350–348
- Career titles: 9
- Highest ranking: No. 18 (17 September 2001)

Grand Slam doubles results
- Australian Open: QF (2000, 2001, 2005)
- French Open: QF (2005)
- Wimbledon: 2R (1990, 2004, 2005, 2007)
- US Open: SF (2002)

Nicole Pratt (born 5 March 1973) is a retired tennis player from Australia.

Pratt was born in Mackay, Queensland. She is the middle sibling of five children of cane farmers and was taught to play by her father, George, who was a top junior player. She attended school in Calen and received a tennis scholarship to the Australian Institute of Sport in Canberra. She turned professional at 18.

She became Australia's No. 1 ranked female player in January 2001. She won her first WTA Title at the Hyderabad Open and reached the third round of the Australian Open in 2004.

In August 2006, at age 33, Pratt reached her first ever Tier I quarterfinal at Toronto. Soon after this she rose back up into the top 100. During 2007 she was drafted by the Boston Lobsters of the WTT pro league.

At the 2008 Australian Open, after losing her first match to Nadia Petrova, a tearful Pratt announced her retirement from professional tennis. She then coached Australian female player, Casey Dellacqua; after the 2009 Australian Open, Pratt and Dellacqua decided to go different ways.

== WTA career finals ==
=== Singles (1 title, 1 runner-up) ===
Legend (singles)
Grand Slam (0)
Tier I (0)
Tier II (0)
Tier III (0)
Tier IV (1)

Result	W/L	Date	Tournament	Surface	Opponent	Score
Loss	0–1	Oct 2001	Beijing China	Hard	(United States) Monica Seles	2–6, 3–6
Win	1–1	Feb 2004	Bangalore, India	Hard	(Russia) Maria Kirilenko	7–6^{(7–3)}, 6–1

=== Doubles (9 titles, 4 runner-ups) ===
Result	W/L	Date	Tournament	Surface	Partner	Opponents	Score
Loss	1.	May 1998	Madrid, Spain	Clay	(Australia) Rachel McQuillan	(Belgium) Dominique Monami (Argentina) Florencia Labat	3–6, 1–6
Win	1.	Jun 2000	Rosmalen, Netherlands	Grass	(United States) Erika deLone	(Slovakia) Karina Habšudová (Australia) Catherine Barclay-Reitz	7–6^{(8–6)}, 4–3 ret.
Win	2.	Nov 2000	Québec, Canada	Hard	(United States) Meghann Shaughnessy	(United States) Kimberly Po-Messerli (Belgium) Els Callens	6–3, 6–4
Win	3.	Aug 2001	Canadian Open	Hard	(United States) Kimberly Po-Messerli	(Slovenia) Katarina Srebotnik (Slovenia) Tina Križan	6–3, 6–1
Loss	2.	Sep 2001	Waikoloa, U.S.	Hard	(Belgium) Els Callens	(Slovenia) Katarina Srebotnik (Slovenia) Tina Križan	2–6, 3–6
Loss	3.	Sep 2003	Bali, Indonesia	Hard	(France) Émilie Loit	(Indonesia) Angelique Widjaja (Venezuela) María Vento-Kabchi	5–7, 2–6
Win	4.	Sep 2003	Beijing, China	Hard	(France) Émilie Loit	(Thailand) Tamarine Tanasugarn (Japan) Ai Sugiyama	6–3, 6–3
Win	5.	Jul 2004	Stanford, U.S.	Hard	(Greece) Eleni Daniilidou	(Luxembourg) Claudine Schaul (Czech Republic) Iveta Benešová	6–2, 6–4
Win	6.	May 2005	Prague, Czech Republic	Clay	(France) Émilie Loit	(Czech Republic) Barbora Záhlavová-Strýcová (Croatia) Jelena Kostanić Tošić	6–7^{(6–8)}, 6–4, 6–4
Win	7.	Jan 2006	Hobart, Australia	Hard	(France) Émilie Loit	(Croatia) Jelena Kostanić Tošić (United States) Jill Craybas	6–2, 6–1
Win	8.	Feb 2007	Pattaya, Thailand	Carpet (i)	(Italy) Mara Santangelo	(Chinese Taipei) Chuang Chia-jung (Chinese Taipei) Chan Yung-jan	6–4, 7–6^{(7–4)}
Win	9.	Feb 2007	Memphis, U.S.	Carpet (i)	(Australia) Bryanne Stewart	(Japan) Akiko Morigami (Slovakia) Jarmila Gajdošová	7–5, 4–6, [10–5]
Loss	4.	Mar 2007	Acapulco, Mexico	Clay	(France) Émilie Loit	(Spain) Arantxa Parra Santonja (Spain) Lourdes Domínguez Lino	3–6, 3–6

== ITF finals ==
$75,000 tournaments
$50,000 tournaments
$25,000 tournaments
$10,000 tournaments

=== Singles (5–8) ===
Result	No.	Date	Tournament	Surface	Opponent	Score
Loss	1.	12 February 1990	ITF Adelaide, Australia	Hard	(Australia) Kirrily Sharpe	6–2, 4–6, 1–6
Loss	2.	19 February 1990	Melbourne, Australia	Hard	(Croatia) Nadin Ercegović	1–6, 5–7
Loss	3.	18 November 1991	Nuriootpa, Australia	Hard	(Australia) Louise Stacey	6–3, 4–6, 5–7
Loss	4.	29 March 1993	Bangkok, Thailand	Hard	(Indonesia) Romana Tedjakusuma	3–6, 2–6
Loss	5.	8 November 1993	Mount Gambier, Australia	Hard	(South Africa) Tessa Price	6–4, 2–6, 0–6
Win	1.	22 November 1993	Nuriootpa, Australia	Hard	(Australia) Michelle Jaggard-Lai	6–7, 6–4, 6–4
Loss	6.	28 November 1993	Mildura, Australia	Hard	(South Africa) Tessa Price	5–7, 6–3, 5–7
Win	2.	27 November 1995	Bendigo, Australia	Hard	(Australia) Annabel Ellwood	6–4, 3–6, 6–2
Win	3.	10 December 1995	Port Pirie, Australia	Hard	(Australia) Annabel Ellwood	4–6, 6–0, 6–4
Win	4.	2 March 1998	Rockford, United States	Hard (i)	(South Africa) Jessica Steck	6–2, 6–3
Loss	7.	3 May 1999	Sarasota, United States	Clay	(United States) Erika deLone	6–7^{(6)}, 7–6^{(7)}, 5–7
Loss	8.	12 July 1999	Morristown, United States	Hard	(United States) Erika deLone	5–7, 6–7^{(1)}
Win	5.	20 February 2000	ITF Midland, United States	Hard	(Japan) Yuka Yoshida	6–4, 6–3

=== Doubles (9–8) ===
Result	No.	Date	Tournament	Surface	Partner	Opponents	Score
Win	1.	13 May 1990	ITF Swansea, United Kingdom	Clay	(Australia) Kirrily Sharpe	(Australia) Catherine Barclay (Australia) Louise Stacey	6–1, 6–2
Win	2.	20 May 1990	ITF Bournemouth, United Kingdom	Clay	(Australia) Kirrily Sharpe	(Australia) Catherine Barclay (Australia) Louise Stacey	6–1, 6–2
Win	3.	11 November 1991	ITF Mount Gambier, Australia	Hard	(Australia) Kristin Godridge	(Netherlands) Ingelise Driehuis (Australia) Louise Pleming	6–7, 6–3, 6–4
Win	4.	3 February 1992	Jakarta, Indonesia	Clay	(Australia) Angie Cunningham	(Romania) Ruxandra Dragomir (Romania) Irina Spîrlea	6–1, 6–0
Win	5.	12 October 1992	Burgdorf, Switzerland	Carpet (i)	(Australia) Kristin Godridge	(Poland) Isabela Listowska (Germany) Petra Winzenhöller	6–3, 6–0
Loss	1.	26 October 1992	Jakarta, Indonesia	Clay	(Australia) Kristin Godridge	(Australia) Michelle Jaggard-Lai (Australia) Kristine Kunce	6–3, 3–6, 2–6
Win	6.	29 March 1993	Bangkok, Thailand	Hard	(Indonesia) Suzanna Wibowo	(Indonesia) Mimma Chernovita (Indonesia) Irawati Iskandar	w/o
Loss	2.	3 July 1994	Stuttgart, Germany	Hard	(Australia) Kirrily Sharpe	(Netherlands) Lara Bitter (Netherlands) Maaike Koutstaal	1–6, 2–6
Loss	3.	21 May 1995	Bordeaux, France	Clay	(United States) Erika deLone	(Netherlands) Seda Noorlander (Czech Republic) Helena Vildová	3–6, 1–6
Win	7.	15 July 1996	Wilmington, United States	Hard	(United States) Erika deLone	(Canada) Maureen Drake (United States) Meilen Tu	7–5, 7–6^{(2)}
Loss	4.	30 September 1996	Newport Beach, United States	Hard	(United States) Erika deLone	(Argentina) Mercedes Paz (Canada) Rene Simpson	3–6, 1–6
Loss	5.	20 April 1997	Wichita, United States	Hard	(Australia) Louise Pleming	(United States) Shannan McCarthy (United States) Kelly Wilson	6–4, 5–7, 2–6
Win	8.	2 June 1997	ITF Tashkent, Uzbekistan	Hard	(United States) Erika deLone	(Spain) Alicia Ortuño (Israel) Hila Rosen	6–3, 6–1
Loss	6.	5 October 1998	ITF Albuquerque, United States	Hard	(United States) Erika deLone	(Australia) Rachel McQuillan (Japan) Nana Miyagi	6–7^{(5)}, 2–6
Loss	7.	3 October 1999	ITF Santa Clara,, United States	Hard	(Australia) Nannie de Villiers	(United States) Debbie Graham (Japan) Nana Smith	4–6, 4–6
Loss	8.	3 April 2000	ITF West Palm Beach, United States	Clay	(United States) Erika deLone	(Japan) Rika Hiraki (Japan) Yuka Yoshida	6–1, 0–6, 6–7^{(5)}
Win	9.	4 March 2006	ITF Las Vegas, United States	Hard	(Australia) Casey Dellacqua	(Brazil) Maria Fernanda Alves (Ukraine) Tatiana Perebiynis	w/o

== Year-end singles ranking ==
- 2007–70
- 2006–78
- 2005–127
- 2004–51
- 2003–53
- 2002–49
- 2001–52
- 2000–55
- 1999-58
- 1998-113
- 1997-102
- 1996-198
- 1995-297
- 1994-182
- 1993-204
- 1992-177
- 1991-241
- 1990-218
- 1989-447
