= Big Merino =

GRC sculpture in Goulburn, Australia

Coordinates: 34.7726°S 149.691°E

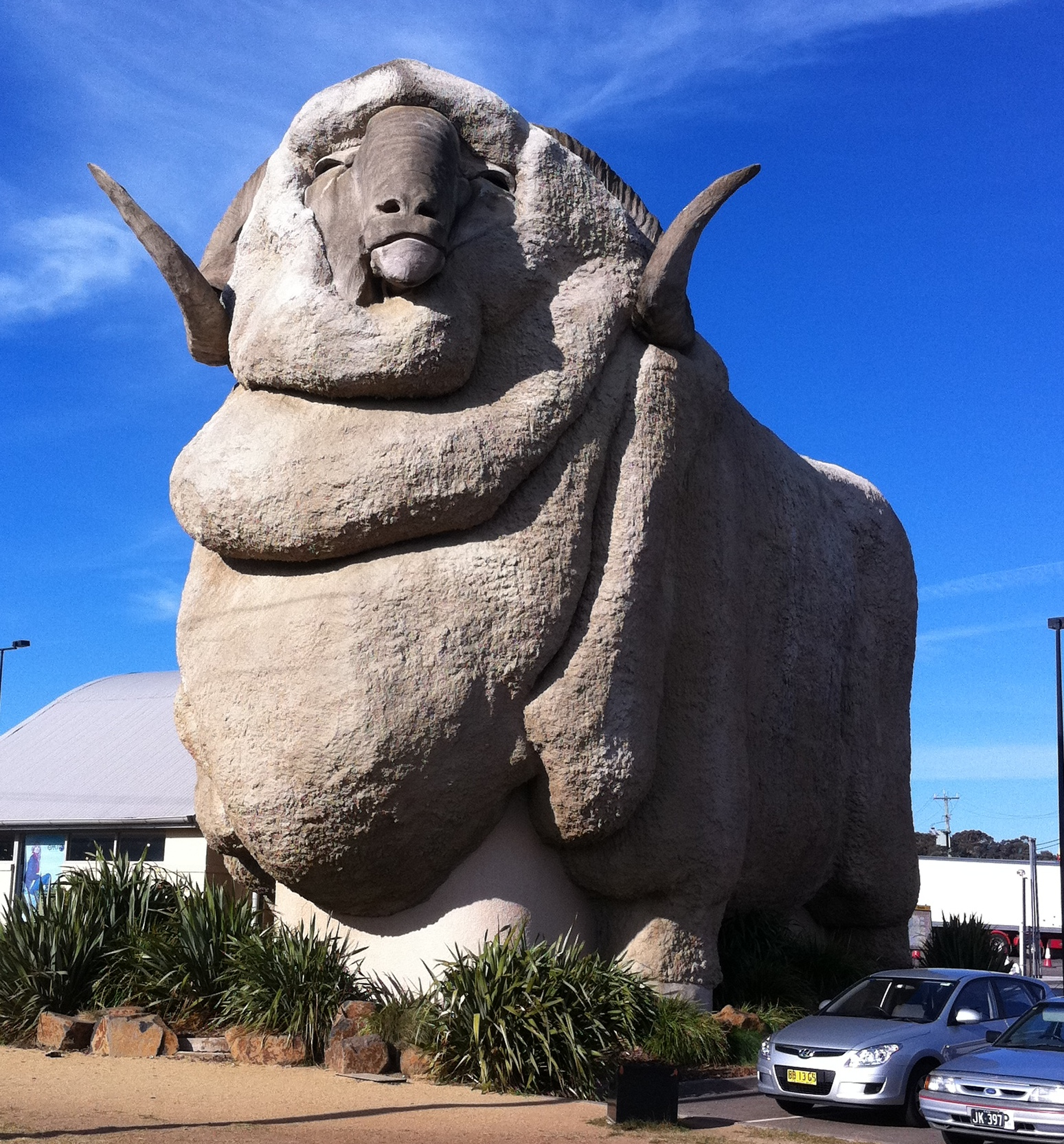
- The Big Merino in 2011
- Designer: Charles Rickard
- Completion date: 1985; 41 years ago
- Medium: Glassfibre-reinforced concrete
- Subject: Merino
- Dimensions: 15.2 m (50 ft) tall, 18 m (59 ft) long
- Weight: 97 tonnes (95 long tons; 107 short tons)
- Location: Goulburn, New South Wales, Australia

The Big Merino is a 15.2-metre (50 ft) tall statue of a merino ram located in Goulburn, New South Wales, Australia. It was modelled after Rambo, a stud ram that lived on a local property, "Bullamallita".

The Big Merino was unveiled on 20 September 1985 by John Brown, the federal minister for sport, recreation and tourism. The idea was originally conceived by brothers Attila and Louis Mokany. The statue was constructed by Adelaide builder Glenn Senner and took six months to build. The frame is steel, covered and shaped with wire mesh, and sprayed and detailed with glassfibre-reinforced concrete. The architect was Gary Dutallis.

The statue was originally situated on Goulburn's Cowper Street, which then formed part of the Hume Highway. In 1992, the highway was rerouted to bypass the town, which resulted in 40 fewer busloads of tourists visiting the Big Merino each day. On 26 May 2007, it was moved closer to the new Hume Highway to increase visitor numbers. It is now located near the freeway interchange at a service station.

Inside the Big Merino is a gift shop, an exhibition on the history of wool in Australia, and an observatory in the ram's eyes.

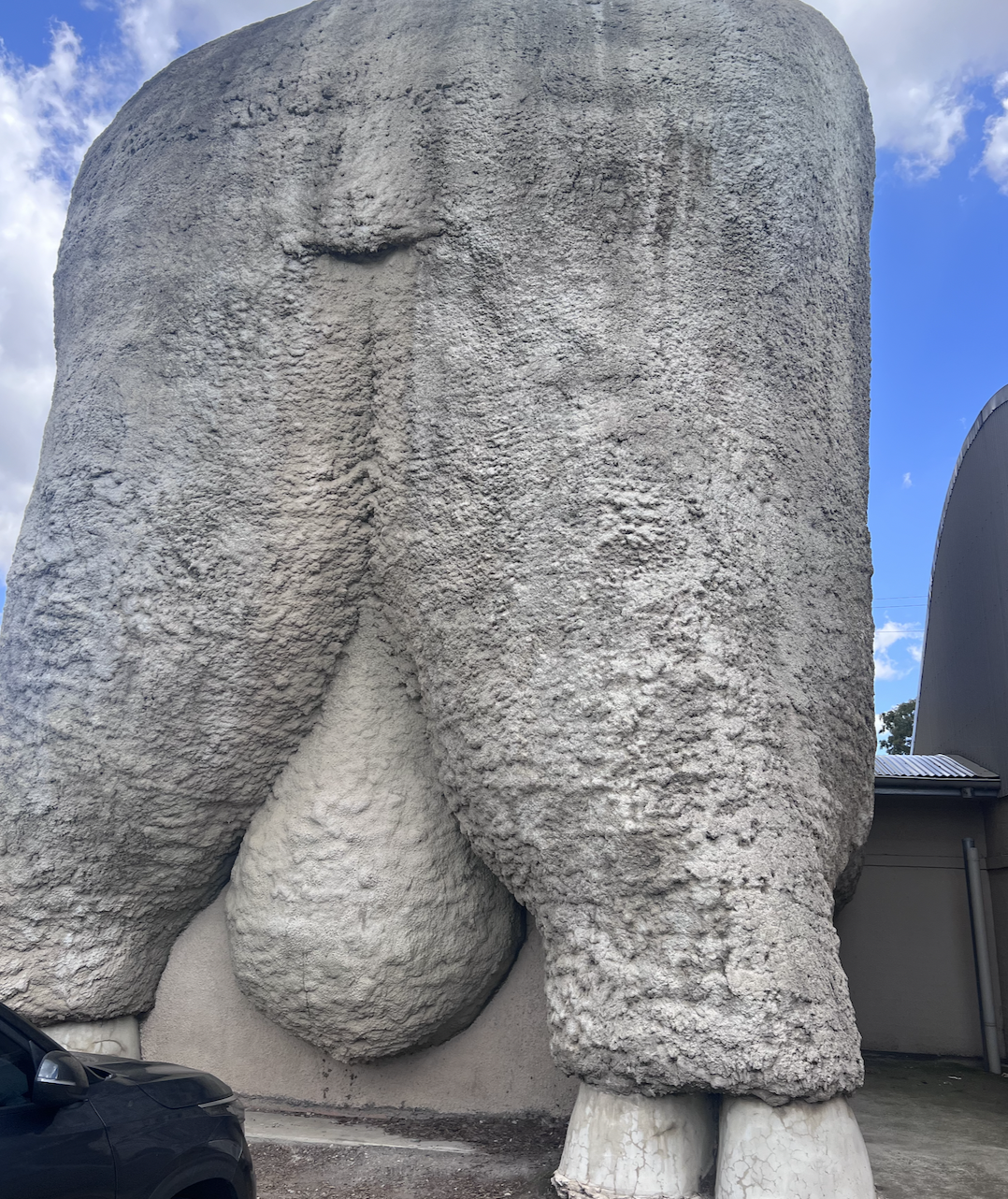
The behind of the Big Merino in 2026

== See also ==
- Australia's big things
- List of world's largest roadside attractions
