= Fairfield Industrial Dog Object =

Wood sculpture in Melbourne

Coordinates: 37°46′45″S 145°01′04″E

Fairfield Industrial Dog Object (FIDO)
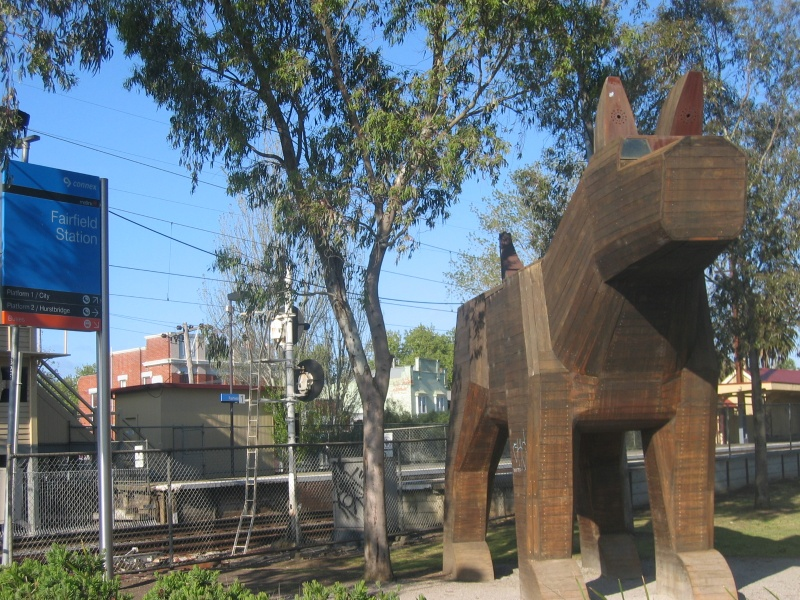
- Artists: Ian Sinclair, Jackie Staude, David Davies and Alistair Knox
- Year: April 2000
- Medium: Australian hardwood
- Dimensions: 5.5 m × 8 m (220 in × 310 in)
- Location: Fairfield, Victoria

The Fairfield Industrial Dog Object (FIDO) is a large sculpture in hardwood of a canine in the inner northern Melbourne suburb of Fairfield, Victoria, Australia. It was part of the Darebin City Council's Public Art Program, and is located beside the Fairfield railway station.

External videos
- Fairfield Industrial Dog Object

== Development ==
FIDO was announced in 1999 as one of a number of projects funded through the council's public art program. From the outset there was considerable community opposition to the project, with members of the local community petitioning the council in order to stop the project from proceeding – at one stage approximately 400 local residents were surveyed by a local shop owner, and it was reported that 90% of those who responded opposed the work. The opposition to the project was such that it has since been described as "one of Melbourne's most fiery debates about public art".

To deal with the concerns, the council engaged in community consultation during all phases of the project's development, and argued that one of the core roles of a council is to provide services supporting arts and culture, in conjunction with the more everyday tasks such as rubbish collection. Nevertheless, some questions remained even after the project's completion in April, 2000. In particular, the $50,000 price tag for FIDO was highlighted by people critical of the council's expenditure on public art, arguing that the money could have been better spent on more essential services.

== Design ==
Erected in April 2000 and created by Ian Sinclair, Jackie Staude, David Davies and Alistair Knox, the work is constructed from recycled hardwood, standing 5.5 metres tall and approximately 8 metres long. The theme was chosen in order to "represent the precinct's dog-loving community", and it was originally designed to interact with viewers – sensors allowed it to respond the presence of onlookers by wagging its tail, wiggling its ears and lighting up at night.

According to the artists (from Creating Place: Public Art Policy and Practice in Darebin):

FIDO responds to the friendly, busy Fairfield Village: conceptually, practically and literally. The usage of materials, the form and the interactive nature of the work are all designed to enhance the sense of community and enjoyment of a unique place. Our Fairfield Industrial Dog Object will be a unifying force, the "pet" that belongs to the community and yet responds to and is remembered by visitors. FIDO watches over the shopping strip, is recognisable from a distance and captivating up close. Through the use of sensors and digital control it is able to be activated in fascinating and unpredictable ways. The selected site at the corner of Wingrove Avenue and Station Streets has enabled us to design a work of monumental scale which will have a strong presence, provide a unifying focus and become a landmark identified with Fairfield.

The original ability to interact (including talk) with onlookers ceased to function prior to 2006, at which point the council was considering whether or not to upgrade the mechanism.

== Impact ==
In spite of the initial controversy, the artists behind the project believed that FIDO has become accepted by the community. That was reflected in the council's decision to incorporate FIDO into the title of their public art plan in 2006: "Beyond Fido: Darebin City Council Public Art Strategy 2006 to 2015", and FIDO becoming part of the Fairfield Traders Association's logo in 2005. In spite of that acceptance, some opposition remained. In 2003, the "Revolutionary Council for the Removal of Bad Art in Public Places" named FIDO as one of the "six worst public art works in Australia" and threatened to set it alight. The council responded that the interstate interest in FIDO was flattering and described the work as a "much-loved sculpture".

FIDO is one of more than 150 objects on the list of Australia's Big Things.

== Gallery ==
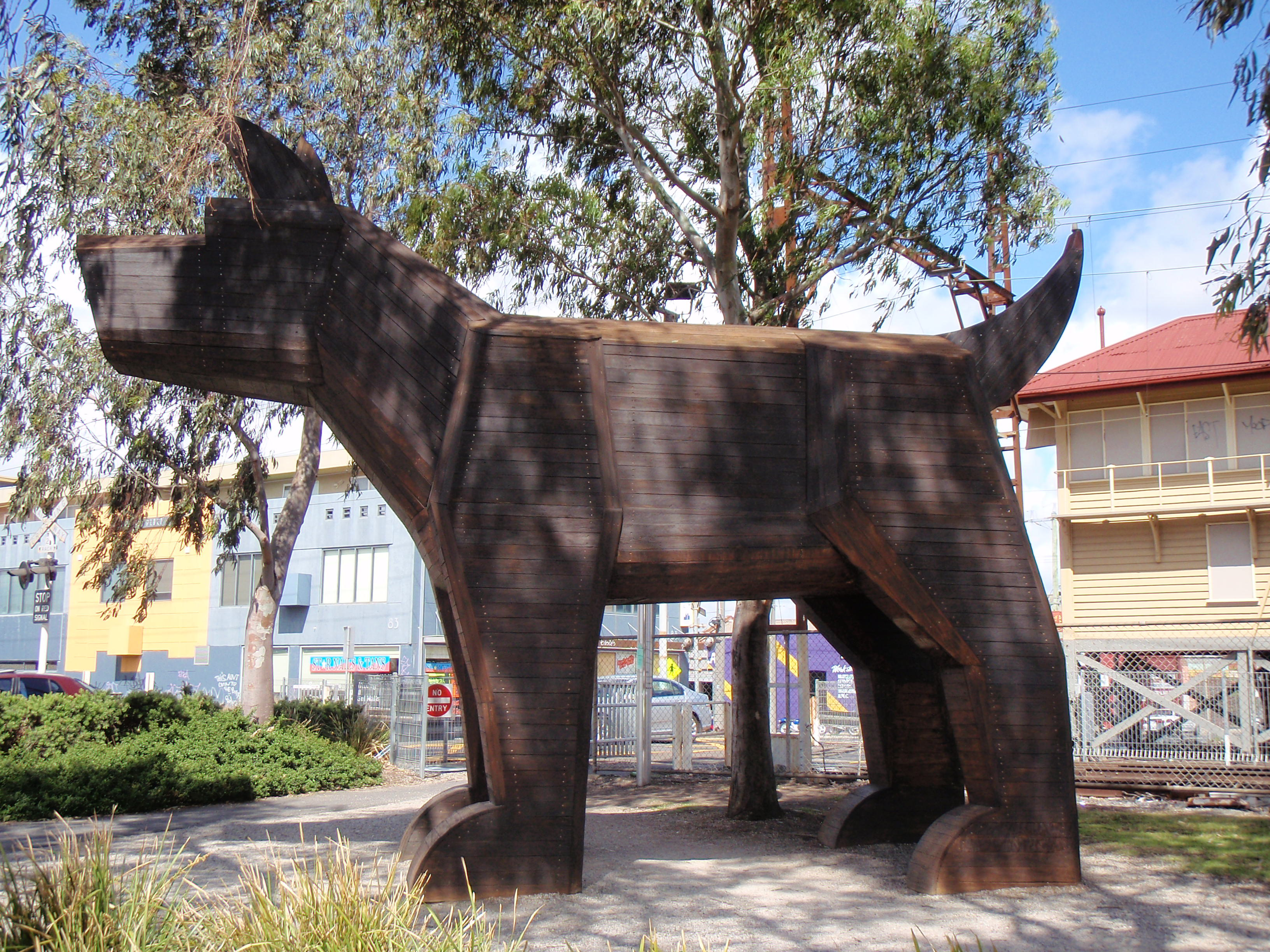
FIDO at Fairfield Station, October 2009

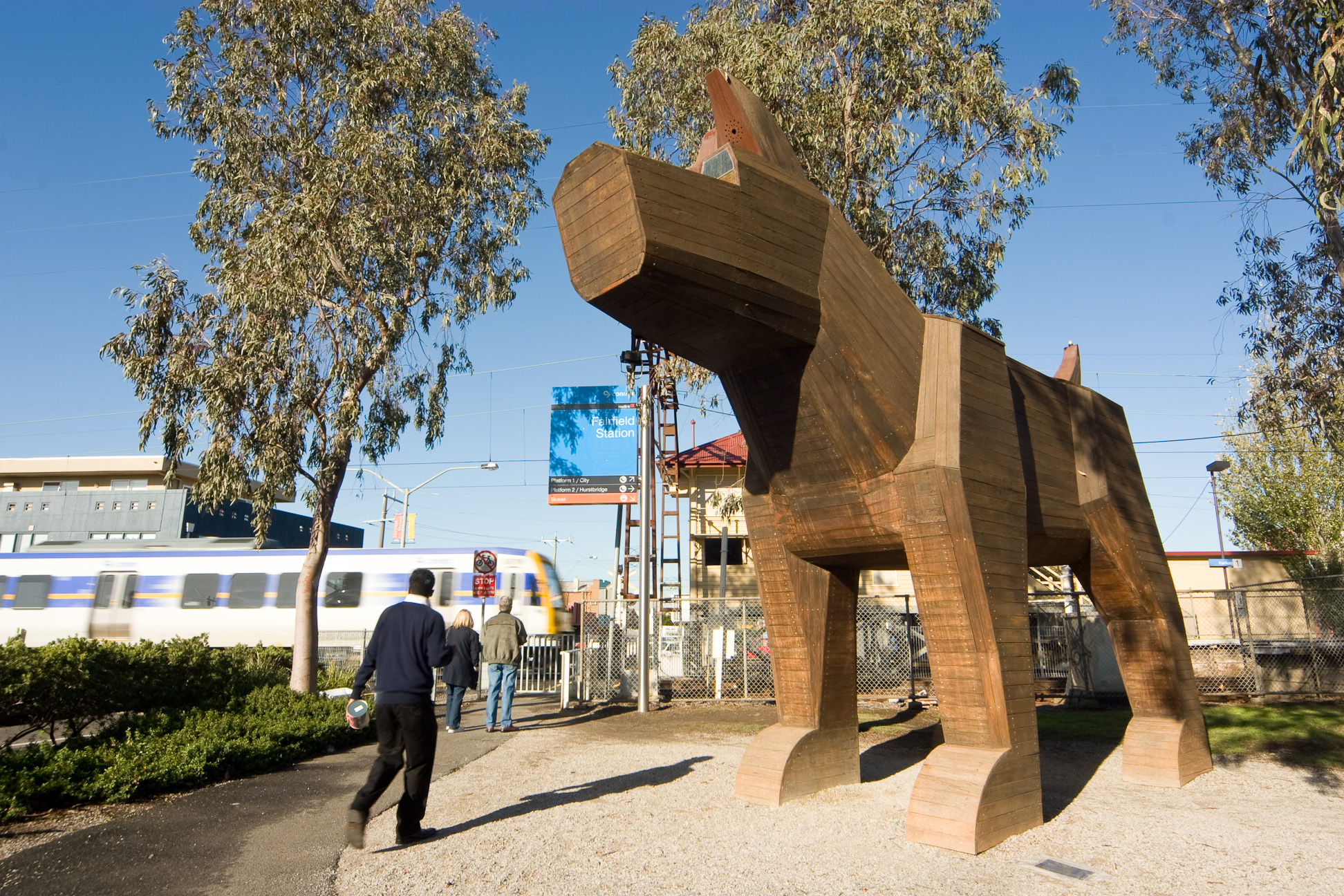
Comparing the size of FIDO with people and trains, June 2007
