= Kinka Beach, Queensland =

Kinka Beach
- Suburb
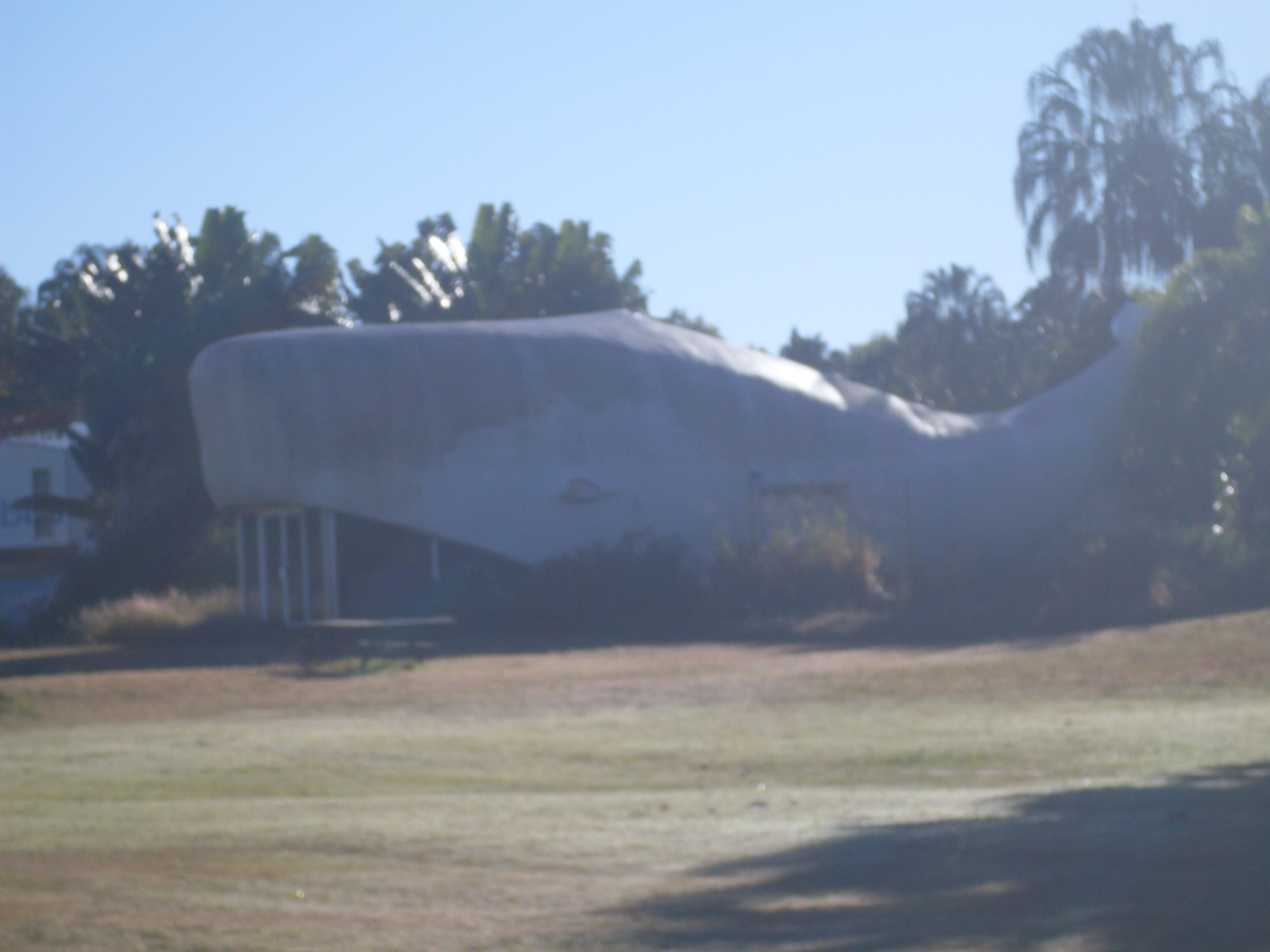
- The Big Whale, one of Australia's big things, 2009

- Interactive map of Kinka Beach
- Coordinates: 23.2258°S 150.7913°E
- Country: Australia
- State: Queensland
- LGA: Shire of Livingstone
- Location: 6.4 km (4.0 mi) NW of Emu Park; 14.4 km (8.9 mi) SSE of Yeppoon; 46.3 km (28.8 mi) NW of Rockhampton; 678 km (421 mi) NNW of Brisbane

Government
  - State electorate: Keppel
  - Federal division: Capricornia

Area
  - Total: 15.8 km^{2} (6.1 sq mi)

Population
  - Total: 674 (2021 census)
  - Density: 42.66/km^{2} (110.5/sq mi)
- Time zone: UTC+10:00 (AEST)
- Postcode: 4703
Suburbs around Kinka Beach
Causeway Lake	Causeway Lake	Causeway Lake
Tanby	Kinka Beach	The Keppels
Tanby	Emu Park	Emu Park

Kinka Beach is a coastal rural locality in the Livingstone Shire, Queensland, Australia. In the 2021 census, Kinka Beach had a population of 674 people.

== Geography ==
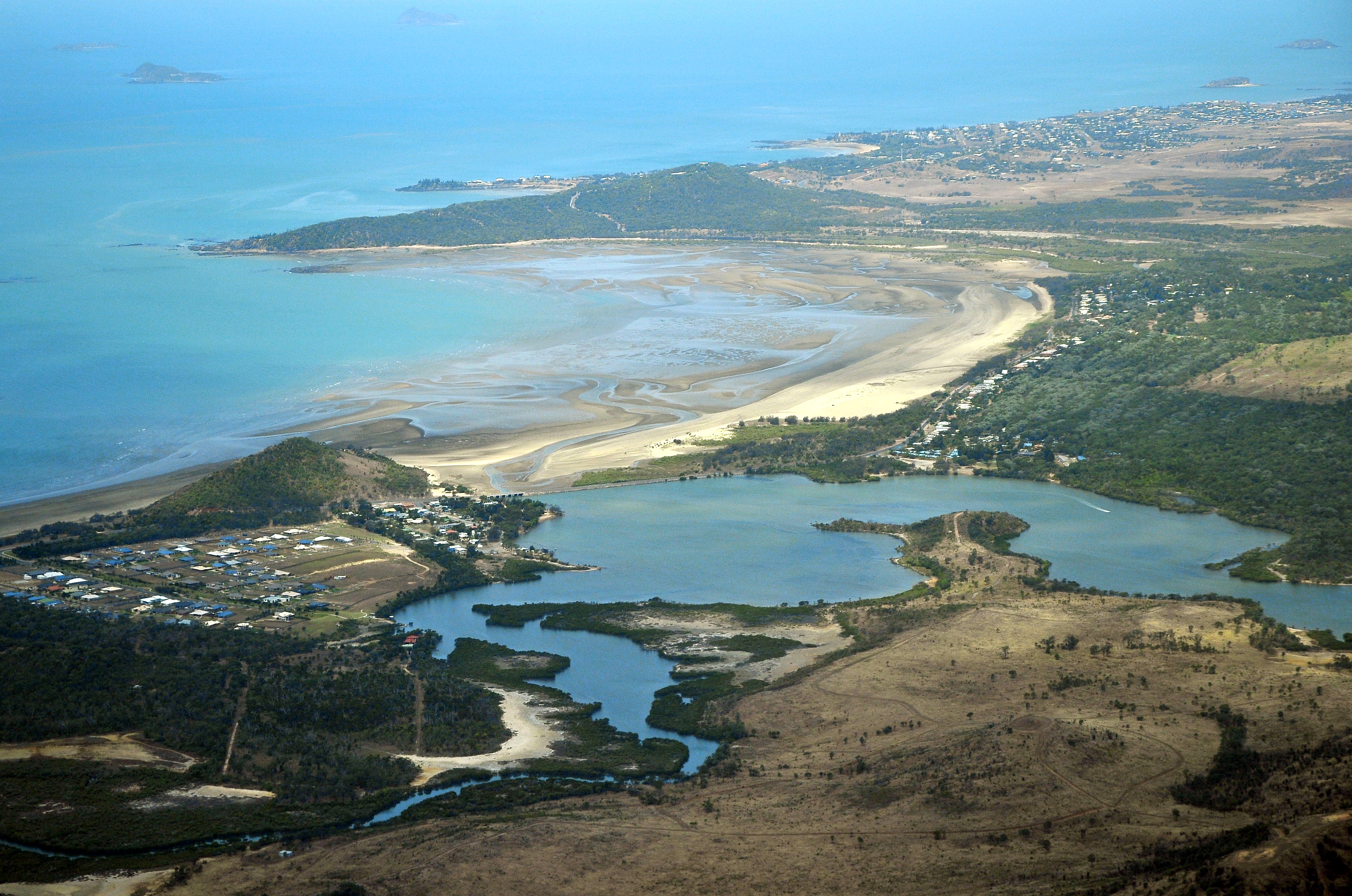
Aerial view of Causeway Lake and Kinka Beach immediately above (to the south), 2009

Kinka Beach is on the Capricorn Coast, situated on the banks of Kinka Creek, about 6 kilometres (3.7 mi) north of Emu Park and 17 kilometres (11 mi) south of Yeppoon.

The Scenic Highway enters the locality from the north (Causeway Lake) and runs close to the coast before exiting to the south-east (Emu Park).

The land in the locality is predominantly undeveloped. The residential areas are near the coast along or just off the Scenic Highway.

Kinka is a residential neighbourhood within the south-east of locality (23.2333°S 150.8°E), which takes its name from former Kinka railway station on the former Emu Park railway line.

Great Keppel Island is off-shore from the locality.

== History ==
Kinka Beach is the traditional land of the Darumbal Aboriginal tribe, as is all of the Capricornia region.

The land including the settlement was originally part of a pastoral lease, but limited development took place after a coastal road linking Emu Park and Yeppoon was made during the 1930s. It was not until the 1960s, however, that substantial residential development took place.

Prior to Local Government Amalgamations in 2008, the Capricorn Coast was administered by Livingstone Shire Council. From 2008 to 2013, the shire was amalgamated into the Rockhampton Region. From 2014, the Shire of Livingstone was re-established and now administers Kinka Beach.

== Demographics ==
In the 2006 census, Kinka Beach had a population of 621 people.

In the 2016 census, Kinka Beach had a population of 621 people.

In the 2021 census, Kinka Beach had a population of 674 people.

== Education ==
There are no schools in Kinka Beach. The nearest government primary school is Emu Park State School in neighbouring Emu Park to the south-east. The nearest government secondary school is Yeppoon State High School in Yeppoon to the north-west.

== Amenities ==
There is one small shop. There is also a caravan park and three motels.

== Transport ==
Kinka Beach is linked to all three centres by a bus service which runs every day including weekends.

== Attractions ==
The Big Whale is one of Australia's big things. It is at 1059 Scenic Highway (23.2264°S 150.7928°E). It was originally built by Kevin Logan as part of a now-closed tourist attraction Coral Life Marine Park.
