= The Big Pelican =

Sculpture in Noosaville, Queensland, Australia

Coordinates: 26°23′53″S 153°03′38″E

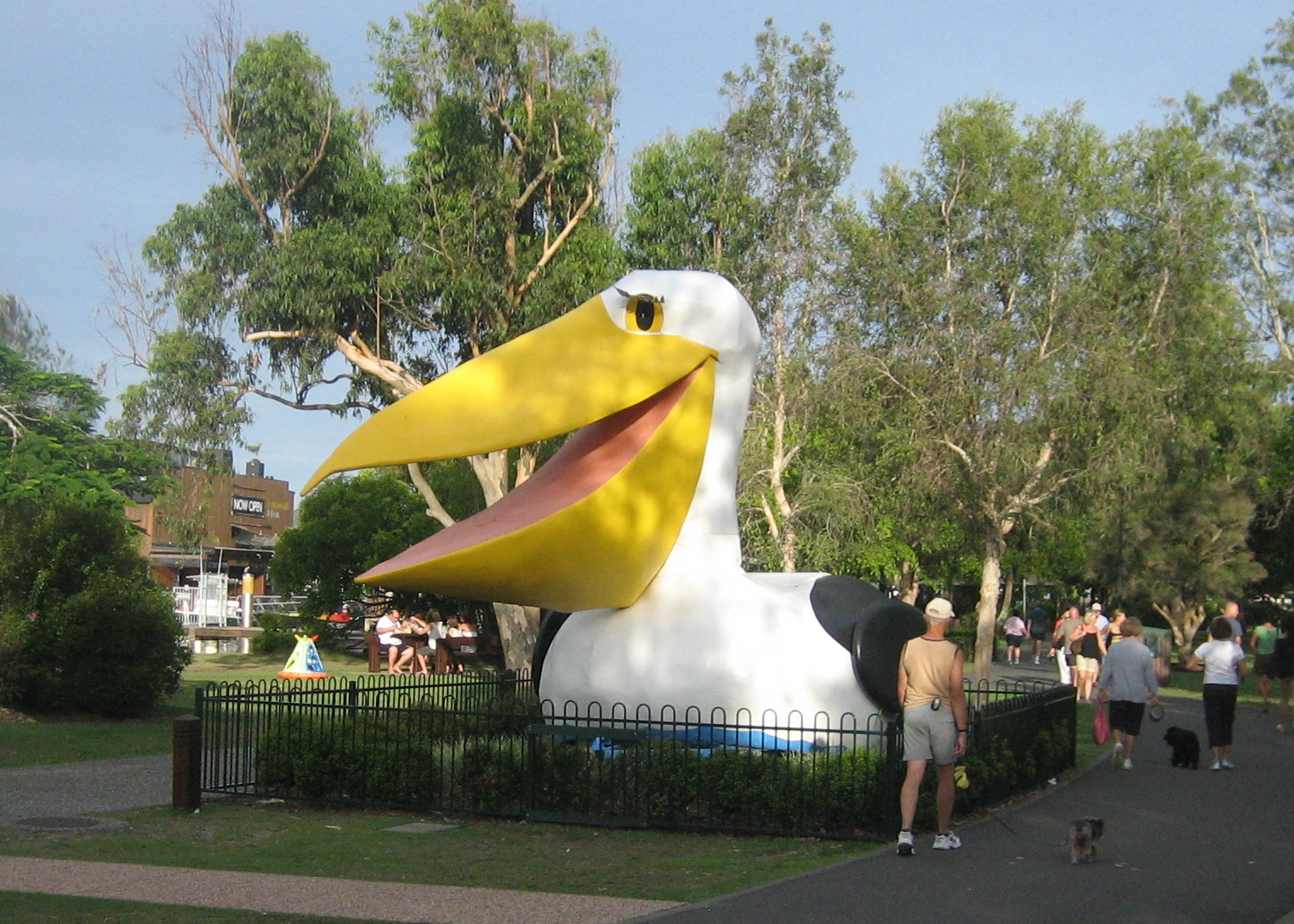
The Big Pelican in 2009

The Big Pelican is a tourist attraction located on the foreshore of the Noosa River in Noosaville (Kabi Kabi Country), Queensland. It is among the several big things in Australia. The attraction is a popular spot for families to visit and take photos, as well as enjoy the surroundings and atmosphere.

== History ==
Affectionately called ‘Pelican Pete’ by locals, the pelican sculpture was created in 1977 to be part of the Council float in the Festival of the Waters street parade. The Council’s emblem at the time was a pelican (but has since been changed to a Boronia).

The Big Pelican was originally designed by the Overseer, Jim Woods, and built by the signwriting staff at the Council’s workshop for Rotoract (a Rotary program young adults). Made of paper mache over a metal frame, the Big Pelican was able to rotate its head, blink its eyelashes, open and shut its bill, flap its wings, and wiggle its tail when operated by two people sitting inside the body using levers, pulleys, and a cable. There is also a seat upon its back to allow passengers to ride and wave to crowds. The Big Pelican participated in many parades over the years but has also required repair a number of times. It was not originally waterproof and one time it capsized off a pontoon into the Noosa River.

It was installed as a static display in front of the Noosa Lakes Motel on Hilton Terrace (now Noosa Lakes Resort) in the 1980s. During the 1990s the Big Pelican was acquired by the owners of Pelican Boat Hire and moved to the roadside of Gympie Terrace. The pelican has since become a beloved meeting place by locals. The Big Pelican was repaired once more so that it could be used in street parades again but was returned to its place next to Pelican Boat Hire in Apex Park after the Gympie Terrace foreshore redevelopment in 2000. In 2007 Pelican Boat Hire restored Pelican Pete once more with fibreglass used to strengthen the structure. Council ceded the land for its permanent location on the foreshore and the Rotary Club at Noosa Heads donated the accompanying garden.

== Published works ==
The pelican is featured on post cards and other tourist material as ‘Percy the Pelican’, believed to be named after Mr Percival from Storm Boy, a book by Colin Thiele with a film adaptation released in 1976.

The Big Pelican stars in the I Can… series by local author, Wendy Alice Wareing, as ‘Peter P. Pelican.’

The Big Pelican is referenced in ‘Duck Cake’, an episode from the second season of the Australian children's show Bluey.
