= Big Bogan =

Coordinates: 31.561998°S 147.194826°E

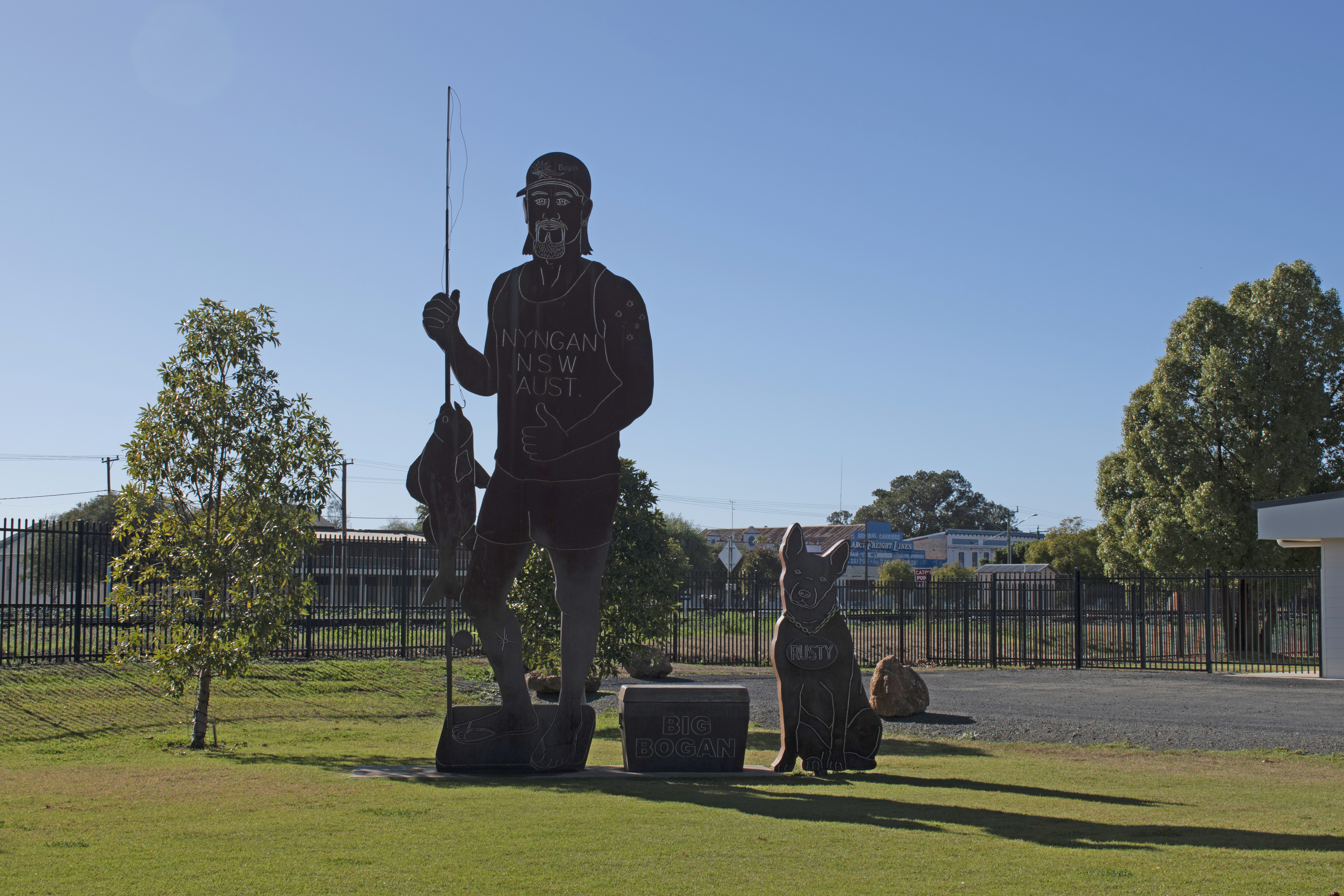
- Subject: Bogan
- Location: Nyngan, New South Wales, Australia

The Big Bogan is a statue in Nyngan, New South Wales, Australia. Nyngan is in Bogan Shire; the proposal to erect a statue of a "bogan" had a mixed reception. The statue was erected on 9 September 2015.

The statue has continued to cause some controversy.

The St. Mark's Anglican Church Minister came up with the idea of erecting a big sculpture that will draw tourists to Nyngan. The Bogan Shire Council began the process in March 2015 and the design of the statue was created digitally and provided to a local steel supplier to make a cut-out. The final product was 5.96 metres (19.6 ft) tall and weighed close to 1,500 kilograms (3,300 lb).

In 2022, a pet dog was added to the sculpture.
