= The Listies =

- Origin: Melbourne, Australia
- Genre: Comedy
- Occupation: Comedian
- Years active: 2008–present
- Members: Richard Higgins, Matthew Kelly
- Website: www.thelisties.com

The Listies, formerly known as The List Operators, are Richard Higgins and Matt Kelly, a double act from Melbourne, Australia, who make live comedy and theatre and TV for "kidults". They regularly tour festivals in Australia and internationally, and also write and illustrate children's books, such as Ickypedia: A Dictionary of Disgusting New Words (2015).

== Career ==
Richard Higgins and Matt Kelly met performing at student theatre at Melbourne's RMIT University though neither were students of the university at the time. They were performing in Just Disgusting, adapted from an Andy Griffiths book by Director in residence Lynne Ellis. "In that very first rehearsal, our scenes got longer and longer," says Kelly. They performed in The Day My Bum Went Psycho next, then Roald Dahl's The Twits".

In 2008, they formed as an alternative comedy and variety act called "The List Operators" (named for their "list-making" schtick,) and performed at the Melbourne International Comedy Festival (MICF).

They began to make work for young audiences in 2010 with a show called More Fun than a wii!, and have been described as "cult figures in the children's theatre world".

The Listies regularly tour festivals in Australia and internationally, including the Edinburgh Fringe Festival and Dublin Fringe Festival.

They have made seven stage shows for children, two for adult audiences, released two albums, and written and illustrated three books (published by Penguin Books under their Puffin Books imprint): Ickypedia (2015), Ickyfoodia (2017), and most recently The Listies’ Teleportaloo (2021).

== Awards and nominations ==
In 2008 they won the Melbourne Comedy festival's best independent show award, the Golden Gibbo.

In 2010 they were nominated for Barry Award at MICF, for More Fun than a wii!, the first kids' show ever to be nominated for this award.

In 2013, the Listies won the Best Production for Children award at the Sydney Theatre Awards, and were nominated for this award again in 2016.

== Style ==
Inspired by "straight guy, funny guy" double acts such as Lano and Woodley, and the sketch comedy of the Goons and Monty Python, the Listies make two-handers which rely on wordplay, prop gags and slapstick, with a "mix of clowning and gross-out humour, general mischief with manic theatrical surprises...(with) a smattering of Easter eggs for the adults in the audience." Their comedy style has also been described as having a "focus on the subversion of the adult desire for control" and as being "unapologetically puerile," They make live comedy and theatre and TV for "kidults"

== Stage shows ==
- The List Operators 2008-2011
- The List Operators for Kids: More Fun than a Wii! 2010-12
- Art+Sport=Yeah! 2012
- The List Operators for Kids do Compooters 2011
- Earworms 2013
- The Listies Ruin Xmas 2015- current
- The Listies 6D (Twice as Good as 3D) 2013-2017
- The Listies Make You LOL! 2014-2017
- Hamlet: Prince of Skidmark 2016- current
- Ickypedia 2017- 2019
- The Listies Go For Bronze 2018
- R.O.F.L.S.H.A.L.B.O.W.C.O (Rolling On The Floor Laughing So Hard A Little Bit Of Wee Comes Out) 2019- current
- The Listies Make Some Noise 2022- current
- 110% Ready 2024- current

== Television ==
- The Listies Work For Peanuts ABC ME (Episodes: All)
- Art Blast ABC ME (Episodes: All)
- Stand And Deliver ABC ME (Episodes: The Listies)
- What's With The Listies? ABC ME (Episodes: The Listies)

== Publications ==
- Ickypedia: A Dictionary of Disgusting New Words 2015
- Ickyfoodia: A Ultimate Guide to Disgusting Food 2017
- The Listies' Teleportaloo 2021
- The Listies' Big Number Two 2022
- The Listies' This Book is a Joke 2025

== Albums ==
- The Listies Drive U Crazy (2012)
- The Listies Go Bananas (2015)
- The Listies' Lollaby
- The Listies Musical Owl Bum
