= Calen =

Calen is a given name. Notable people with the name include:

- Calen Addison (born 2000), Canadian ice hockey player
- Calen Bullock (born 2003), American football player
- Calen Carr (born 1982), American soccer player

== See also ==
- Calen, Queensland
