= County of Buxton =

Buxton
- Cadastral division
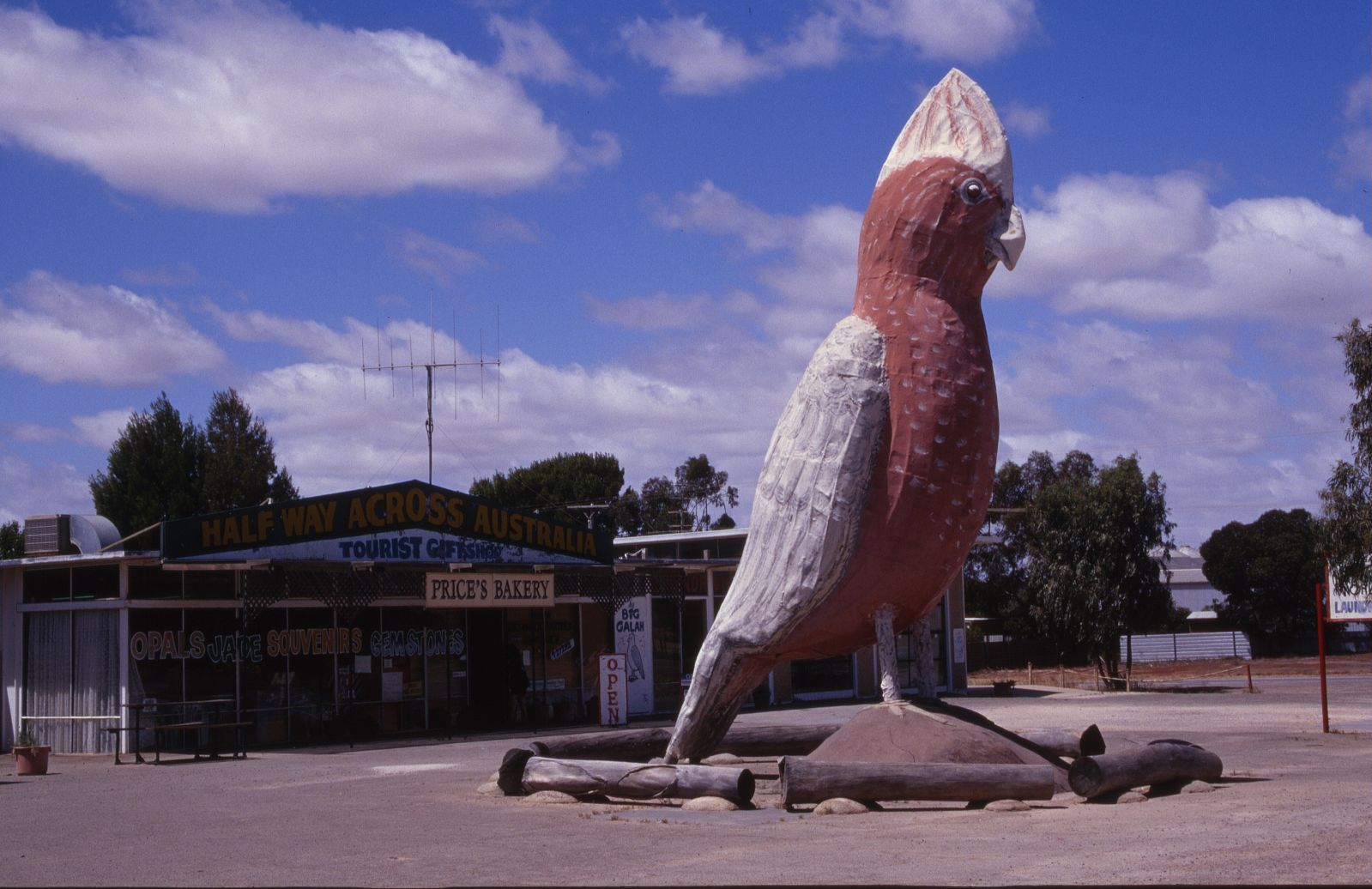
- Big Galah sculpture in Kimba where the hundreds of Solomon, Kelly, Moseley and Cortlinye intersect

- Coordinates: 33.041070°S 136.395610°E
- Country: Australia
- State: South Australia
- Region: Far North; Eyre Western
- LGA(s): District Council of Kimba (part) Pastoral Unincorporated Area
- Established: 1896

Area
  - Total: 4,670 km^{2} (1,805 sq mi)
Lands administrative divisions around Buxton
Bosanquet	Hore-Ruthven	Hore-Ruthven
Le Hunte	Buxton	Hore-Ruthven; York
Jervois	Jervois	Jervois

County of Buxton is a cadastral unit located in the Australian state of South Australia that covers land located in the centre of Eyre Peninsula. It was proclaimed in 1896 and named after Thomas Buxton who was the Governor of South Australia from 29 October 1895 to 29 March 1899. It has been divided into thirteen sub-divisions known as hundreds, with the most recent being created in 1928.

== Description ==
The County of Buxton covers a part of South Australia associated with the eastern side of the centre of Eyre Peninsula located south of the Gawler Ranges. It is bounded to the west by the County of Le Hunte, to the south by the County of Jervois and to the east by the County of York and to the north by the County of Hore-Ruthven.

The county is served by the following major roads - the Buckleboo Road which enters the county from the north-west and terminates in Kimba, the Cleve Road which enters from the south and meets the Cowell-Kimba Road which enters from the south-east and terminates in Kimba and the Eyre Highway which passes through the county from east to west.

Settlements include Kimba, the principal town and municipal seat located on the Eyre Highway, Buckleboo located in the county's north-west and Waddikee located in the county's south.

The Cummins to Buckleboo line of the Eyre Peninsula Railway passes into the county from the south and terminates in the locality of Buckleboo.

Land use within the county is divided between primary industry and conservation. The protected areas are located in the county include the following conservation parks and conservation reserves:

1. Conservation parks - Caralue in the south west, Lake Gilles in the north-east corner, Malgra in the south-east and the eastern end of the Pinkawillinie at the western side.
2. Conservation reserves - the Buckleboo, Cunyarie, Lacroma, Mootra, Moongi, Pinkawillinie Reservoir, and Tola Conservation Reserves are located in the county's centre adjoining the alignment of the Cummins to Buckleboo line of the Eyre Peninsula railway, and the Poolgarra Conservation Reserve located in the county's south-west corner.

Its extent includes the local government area of the District Council of Kimba with the state's Pastoral Unincorporated Area occupying land along its northern and north-eastern sides.

== History ==
The County of Buxton was proclaimed under the Crown Lands Act 1888 on 13 August 1896 along with the Hundred of Kelly.

The naming of the county after Governor Buxton who was the Governor of South Australia from 29 October 1895 to 29 March 1899, by the South Australian government follows "a precedent which was established in 1842" when a county was named after Governor Gawler.

The following hundreds have been proclaimed within the county - Kelly in 1896, Solomon in 1909, Cortlinye and Moseley in 1914, Barna, Caralue and Yalanda in 1917, Buckleboo, Cunyarie and Pinkawillinie in 1922, Wilcherry in 1924, O'Connor in 1925 and Panitya in 1928.

== Constituent hundreds ==
=== Location of constituent hundreds ===
The hundreds are laid out in four columns in the west–east direction as follows:

1. Caralue, Panitya, Pinkawillinie and Buckleboo from south to north along the county's western boundary.
2. Solomon, Cortlinye and Cunyarie.
3. Kelly, Moseley and Wilcherry.
4. The most easterly column of hundreds consists of the Hundreds of Yalanda, Barna and O'Connor in the south-east corner of the county with the land in the north-east corner of the county has not proclaimed as one or more hundreds.

=== Hundred of Barna ===
The Hundred of Barna (33°10′35″S 136°42′29″E) was proclaimed on 26 July 1917. It covers an area of 220 square kilometres (85 sq mi) and is either named after a nearby hill or after a surveyor with the name of Barns. The locality of Barna occupies most of the hundred with a part of the locality of Yalanda occupying some land on its southern boundary.

=== Hundred of Buckleboo ===
The Hundred of Buckleboo (32°51′20″S 136°08′03″E) was proclaimed on 1 June 1922. It covers an area of 483 square kilometres (186.5 sq mi) and is named after the "native name of (an) adjacent pastoral run." The locality of Buckleboo occupies most of the hundred with the locality of Bungeroo occupying the hundred's north-eastern corner.

=== Hundred of Caralue ===
The Hundred of Caralue (33°10′30″S 136°42′34″E) was proclaimed on 26 July 1917. It covers an area of 312.7 square kilometres (120.75 sq mi) and is named after Caralue Bluff, a geographical feature located within the boundaries of the hundred. The locality of Caralue occupies most of the hundred with a portion of the locality of Panitya extending from the north into the hundred to the north boundary of the Caralue Bluff Conservation Park while the south-east corner is occupied by part of the locality of Waddikee.

=== Hundred of Cortlinye ===
The Hundred of Caralue (33°10′30″S 136°42′34″E) was proclaimed on 1 October 1914. It covers an area of 312.7 square kilometres (120.75 sq mi) and its name is derived from a "native word for blackoak." The locality of Cortlinye occupies most of the hundred with a portion of the locality of Kimba extending from the south into the hundred.

=== Hundred of Cunyarie ===
The Hundred of Cunyarie (32°51′03″S 136°20′14″E) was proclaimed on 1 June 1922. It covers an area of 224 square kilometres (86.5 sq mi) and is named after a nearby geographical feature, the Cunyarie Rockhole. The locality of Cunyarie occupies most of the hundred while its northern end is occupied by part of the locality of Yeltana to the west and by part of the locality of Uno to the east.

=== Hundred of Kelly ===
The Hundred of Kelly (33°13′38″S 136°30′57″E) was proclaimed on 13 August 1896. It covers an area of 366 square kilometres (141.5 sq mi) and is named after one of the following three former members of the South Australian Parliament - Hugh Craine Kelly, John Robert Kelly or Robert Kelly. The locality of Kelly occupies most of the hundred with its north-western corner containing part of the locality of Kimba.

=== Hundred of Moseley ===
The Hundred of Moseley (33°01′48″S 136°30′35″E) was proclaimed on 1 October 1914. It covers an area of 310 square kilometres (120 sq mi) and is named after James Grey Moseley, a former member of the South Australian Parliament. The locality of Moseley occupies most of the hundred with its north-eastern corner containing parts of the localities of Lake Gilles and Uno.

=== Hundred of O'Connor ===
The Hundred of O'Connor (33°04′23″S 136°42′07″E) was proclaimed on 24 September 1925. It covers an area of 230 square kilometres (87 sq mi) and is named after John O'Connor, a former member of the South Australian Parliament. The boundaries of the hundred lie within those of the locality of Lake Gilles.

=== Hundred of Panitya ===
The Hundred of Panitya (33°10′58″S 136°07′39″E) was proclaimed on 28 June 1928. It covers an area of 267.4 square kilometres (103.25 sq mi) and is derived from an aboriginal word meaning "a piece of land." The northern side of the hundred is within the locality of Pinkawillinie while its southern side is within the locality of Panitya.

=== Hundred of Pinkawillinie ===
The Hundred of Pinkawillinie (33°01′53″S 136°07′30″E) was proclaimed on 1 June 1922. It covers an area of 453.9 square kilometres (175.25 sq mi) and its name is derived from an aboriginal word. The boundaries of the hundred lie within those of the locality of Pinkawillinie.

=== Hundred of Solomon ===
The Hundred of Solomon (33°13′25″S 136°20′35″E) was proclaimed on 21 January 1909. It covers an area of 367.1 square kilometres (141.75 sq mi) and is named after Vaiben Louis Solomon, a former member of the South Australian Parliament and a former Premier of South Australia. The locality of Solomon occupies most of the hundred with its south-western corner containing part of the locality of Waddikee and its north-eastern corner containing part of the locality of Kimba.

=== Hundred of Wilcherry ===
The Hundred of Wilcherry (32°51′36″S 136°30′26″E) was proclaimed on 18 December 1924. It covers an area of 330 square kilometres (126 sq mi) and is derived from the aboriginal name for a nearby hill which is also used for a pastoral run and a dam. The locality of Wilcherry occupies the south-eastern corner of the hundred while the remainder is occupied by part of the locality of Uno.

=== Hundred of Yalanda ===
The Hundred of Yalanda (33°16′34″S 136°42′36″E) was proclaimed on 26 July 1917. It covers an area of 224 square kilometres (86.5 sq mi) and is derived from "the 'Yalanda Run', held by J. Sinclair from 1872 (lease no. 2182)" and ultimately from the aboriginal name for a nearby hill. The locality of Yalanda occupies most of the hundred with a part of the locality of Kelly occupying some land on its western boundary.

== See also ==
- Lands administrative divisions of South Australia
- Buxton (disambiguation)
