= County of Hore-Ruthven =

Hore-Ruthven
- Cadastral division
- Coordinates: 32.49°S 136.57°E
- Country: Australia
- State: South Australia
- Region: Far North
- LGA(s): Pastoral Unincorporated Area
- Established: 1933

Area
  - Total: 7,040 km^{2} (2,718 sq mi)
Lands administrative divisions around Hore-Ruthven
Bosanquet	Hore-Ruthven	Manchester
Le Hunte	Buxton; York	York
- Coordinates; Adjoining counties

County of Hore-Ruthven is a cadastral unit in the Australian state of South Australia that covers land both in the north of the Eyre Peninsula and to the peninsula's north. It was proclaimed in 1933 and was named after Alexander Hore-Ruthven, the Governor of South Australia from 1928 to 1934.

== Description ==
The county covers land extending from the southern end of Lake Gairdner in the north-west to the northern end of Lake Gilles in the south-east. Its southern end is located within the Eyre Peninsula. It is bounded to the west by the County of Bosanquet, to the south by the Counties of Buxton and York, and to the east by the County of Manchester.

The county contains no formal settlements, but it does include, in part, the following localities of which the majority are based on pastoral leases: Bungeroo, Buckleboo, Carriewerloo, Cooyerdoo, Corunna Station, Gilles Downs, Katunga Station, Kolendo, Lake Gairdner, Lake Gilles, Mount Ive, Nonning, Siam, Uno, Wartaka, Yeltana and Yudnapinna.

The county is served by the following roads – the Eyre Highway passes through the south-east corner of the county on its way from Iron Knob in the east to Kimba in the west, and the Nonning Road passes through the county in a west–east direction on its way from Iron Knob to Kingoonya in the north.

No hundreds have ever been proclaimed within the county.

== See also ==
- Lands administrative divisions of South Australia
