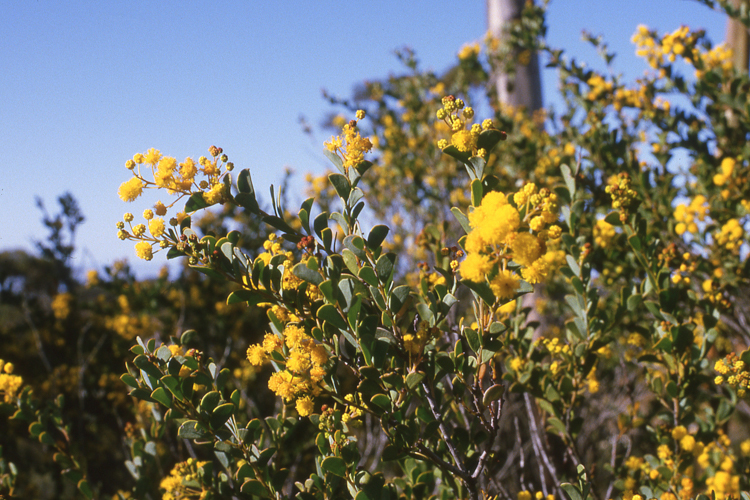

Conservation status
- Priority One — Poorly Known Taxa (DEC)

Scientific classification
- Kingdom: Plantae
- Clade: Embryophytes
- Clade: Tracheophytes
- Clade: Angiosperms
- Clade: Eudicots
- Clade: Rosids
- Order: Fabales
- Family: Fabaceae
- Subfamily: Caesalpinioideae
- Clade: Mimosoid clade
- Genus: Acacia
- Species: A. dorsenna

Binomial name
- Acacia dorsenna Maslin
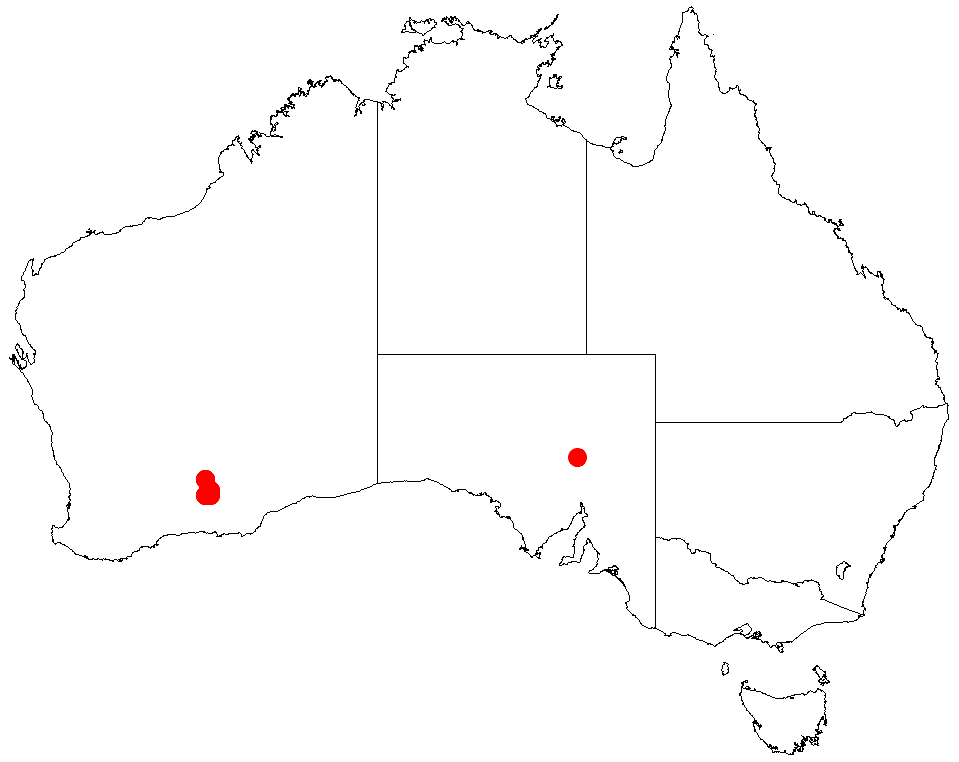
- Occurrence data from AVH

Synonyms
- Racosperma dorsennum (Maslin) Pedley

= Acacia dorsenna =

Species of legume

Acacia dorsenna is a species of flowering plant in the family Fabaceae and is endemic to a restricted region of inland Western Australia. It is a dense, domed, glabrous shrub with elliptic to egg-shaped phyllodes, spherical heads of bright, mid-golden yellow flowers and narrowly oblong pods rounded over the seeds.

== Description ==
Acacia dorsenna is dense, domed, glabrous shrub that typically grows to a height of 1.0–1.6 m (3 ft 3 in – 5 ft 3 in) and up to 3 m (9.8 ft) wide. Its phyllodes are elliptic to egg-shaped with the narrower end towards the base, with a markedly convex upper margin 10–15 mm (0.39–0.59 in) long and 5–9 mm (0.20–0.35 in) with a small gland 0.5–2 mm (0.020–0.079 in) above the base of the phyllode. The flowers are borne in seven to ten spherical heads in racemes 19–25 mm (0.75–0.98 in) long, the heads on peduncles 4–16 mm (0.16–0.63 in) long, each head with 15 to 21 bright mid-golden yellow flowers. Flowering has been recorded in August and September, and the pods are narrowly oblong, up to 60 mm (2.4 in) long and 11 mm (0.43 in) wide, brown, firmly papery, and conspicuously rounded over the seeds. The seeds are oblong-elliptic, of up to 4 mm (0.16 in) long with a small aril.

It is a member of the A. prainii group and resembles A. camptoclada and some forms of A. merrallii.

== Taxonomy ==
Acacia dorsenna was first formally described in 1995 by Bruce Maslin in the journal Nuytsia from specimens he collected north of Norseman in 1986. The specific epithet (dorsenna) means 'humpbacked', "alluding to the predominantly rounded upper margin of the phyllodes".

== Distribution and habitat ==
This species of wattle grows in red-brown, rocky, sandy loam or clayey loam and is only known from two populations about 25 km (16 mi) north of Norseman in the Coolgardie bioregion of inland Western Australia.

== Conservation status ==
Acacia dorsenna is listed as 'Priority One' by the Government of Western Australia Department of Biodiversity, Conservation and Attractions, meaning that it is known from only one or a few locations that are potentially at risk.

== See also ==
- List of Acacia species
