= Kimba =

Kimba may refer to:

== People ==
- Kimba Wood (born 1944), U.S. federal judge
- Évariste Kimba (1926–1966), Republic of the Congo's Prime Minister in 1965

== Places ==
=== South Australia ===
- Kimba, South Australia, a town and locality
- District Council of Kimba, a local government area
- Kimba Airport

=== Elsewhere ===
- Kimba District, District in the Pool Department of Republic of the Congo
- Kimba Payam, South Sudan

== Other uses ==
- Kimba language, language in Nigeria
- Kimba the White Lion, a manga and anime series by Osamu Tezuka

== See also ==
- Kemba (disambiguation)
