= Secret Rocks =

Secret Rocks may refer to:

- Secret Rocks, South Australia, a locality on northeastern Eyre Peninsula in South Australia
- Secret Rocks Nature Reserve, a private nature reserve on the former pastoral lease of the same name
