= Pinkawillinie, South Australia =

Pinkawillinie
- Town
- Coordinates: 33.0°S 136.1°E
- Country: Australia
- State: South Australia
- LGAs: District Council of Kimba; Unincorporated area

Government
  - State electorate: Giles
  - Federal division: Grey

Population
  - Total: 51 (SAL 2021)
- Postcode: 5641
Localities around Pinkawillinie
Gawler Ranges	Buckleboo	Cunyarie
Wudinna	Pinkawillinie	Cortlinye
Koongawa	Panitya	Solomon

Pinkawillinie is a locality in the north of Eyre Peninsula in South Australia. It is a rural grain and grazing area in marginal country near Goyder's Line within the District Council of Kimba. It draws its name from the cadastral Hundred bearing the same name which is mostly included in the modern bounded locality, however the locality includes several other Hundreds and the Pinkawillinie Conservation Park, all within the Kimba region.

Settlement in this area was spurred by the completion of the railway line to Port Lincoln, which reached Buckleboo in 1926.

A school was approved in 1929. It was originally intended that the residents would build it with assistance of a loan from the Government, however a poor season meant they were unable to proceed, so a portable building was supplied, and a head teacher announced for 1930. The school is now closed. In the 1950s it was only a junior primary school, with children transported to Kimba for higher primary school.

In November 2015, Pinkiwillinie was identified as one of six sites short-listed for a possible low- and intermediate-level radioactive waste repository in Australia.

== Hundred ==
Pinkawillinie
- Cadastral division
- Country: Australia
- State: South Australia
- Established: 1922

Area
  - Total: 453.9 km^{2} (175.25 sq mi)

Population
  - Total: 51 (SAL 2021)
- County: Buxton
Lands administrative divisions around Pinkawillinie
Corrobinnie	Buckleboo	Cunyarie
Peella	Pinkawillinie	Cortlinye
Koongawa	Panitya	Solomon

The Hundred of Pinkawillinie (coordinates for Pinkawillinie Reservoir), located in the County of Buxton is one of over 540 proclaimed hundreds in South Australia. It is part of the District Council of Kimba and is served by the local township of the same name. The name Pinkawillinie itself has had a number of apocryphal attributions, however the most commonly accepted being a translated aboriginal word meaning "Place of the many rabbit-footed bandicoot burrows".

Located in central Eyre Peninsula, County Buxton was first proclaimed in 1896, however the Hundred of Pinkawillinie was not proclaimed until 1922, along with Hundred of Buckleboo and Hundred of Cunyarie. Land was released, surveyed and apportioned on an application basis, with the latest Sections being surveyed as late as the 1960s and 1970s. However, the limiting factor for early settlers was the availability of water, and allocations were generally preferentially selected around rare rocky outcrops or uplands which could afford some opportunities for increased runoff into earthen dams. Indeed, access to water was a critical factor in European settlement of Eyre Peninsula.

Geomorphologically Pinkawillinie is dominated by generally flat calcreted plains with longitudinal dunes increasing in frequency to the south west toward the Corrobinnie Depression. Low rises of Archaean Sleaford Complex bedrock of the Gawler craton and derivative laterite can also be found, with most of the land within the hundred given over to cereal cultivation and livestock grazing.

The Pinkawillinie Conservation Park occupies the south western corner of the original hundred, but due to the nature of the deep white sand filling the Corrobinnie Depression, this land was deemed unsuitable for agriculture and hence was incorporated into the park in 1970, with the remainder of the unallocated crown land to the west of the Buckleboo district being added in 1983. The park encompasses 132 000 hectares and abuts the Gawler Ranges National Park to the north west. There is limited 2wd access to the park and no facilities.

== See also ==
- Lands administrative divisions of South Australia
- Corrobinnie Hill Conservation Park
