= Barna, South Australia =

Barna South Australia
- Coordinates: 33°10′40″S 136°40′24″E
- Population: 30 (SAL 2021)
- Established: 6 May 1999
- Postcode(s): 5641
- Time zone: ACST (UTC+9:30)
  - Summer (DST): ACST (UTC+10:30)
- Location: 266 km (165 mi) NW of Adelaide; 23 km (14 mi) E of Kimba
- LGA(s): District Council of Kimba
- Region: Eyre Western
- County: Buxton
- State electorate(s): Giles
- Federal division(s): Grey
Mean max temp	Mean min temp	Annual rainfall
23.7 °C; 75 °F	10.3 °C; 51 °F	344.8 mm 13.6 in
Suburbs around Barna:
Moseley	Lake Gilles	Cooyerdoo
Kelly	Barna	Cooyerdoo; Secret Rocks
Kelly	Yalanda	Secret Rocks
- Footnotes: Locations; Adjoining localities

Barna is a locality in the Australian state of South Australia located on the Eyre Peninsula about 266 kilometres (165 mi) north-west of the state capital of Adelaide and about 23 kilometres (14 mi) east of the municipal seat in Kimba.

Barna's boundaries were created on 6 May 1999 for the "local established name" which is derived from the cadastral unit of the Hundred of Barna. The boundaries of both the locality and the hundred align with exception to some land on the locality's southern boundary. The Middleback Road, an unsealed road, passes through the locality from the Lincoln Highway in the east to Kimba in the west. Land use within the locality is "primary production".

Barna is located within the federal division of Grey, the state electoral district of Giles and the local government area of the District Council of Kimba.
