= Acacia hexaneura =

Cowell spine-bush

Scientific classification
- Kingdom: Plantae
- Clade: Tracheophytes
- Clade: Angiosperms
- Clade: Eudicots
- Clade: Rosids
- Order: Fabales
- Family: Fabaceae
- Subfamily: Caesalpinioideae
- Clade: Mimosoid clade
- Genus: Acacia
- Species: A. hexaneura

Binomial name
- Acacia hexaneura P.J.Lang & R.S.Cowan
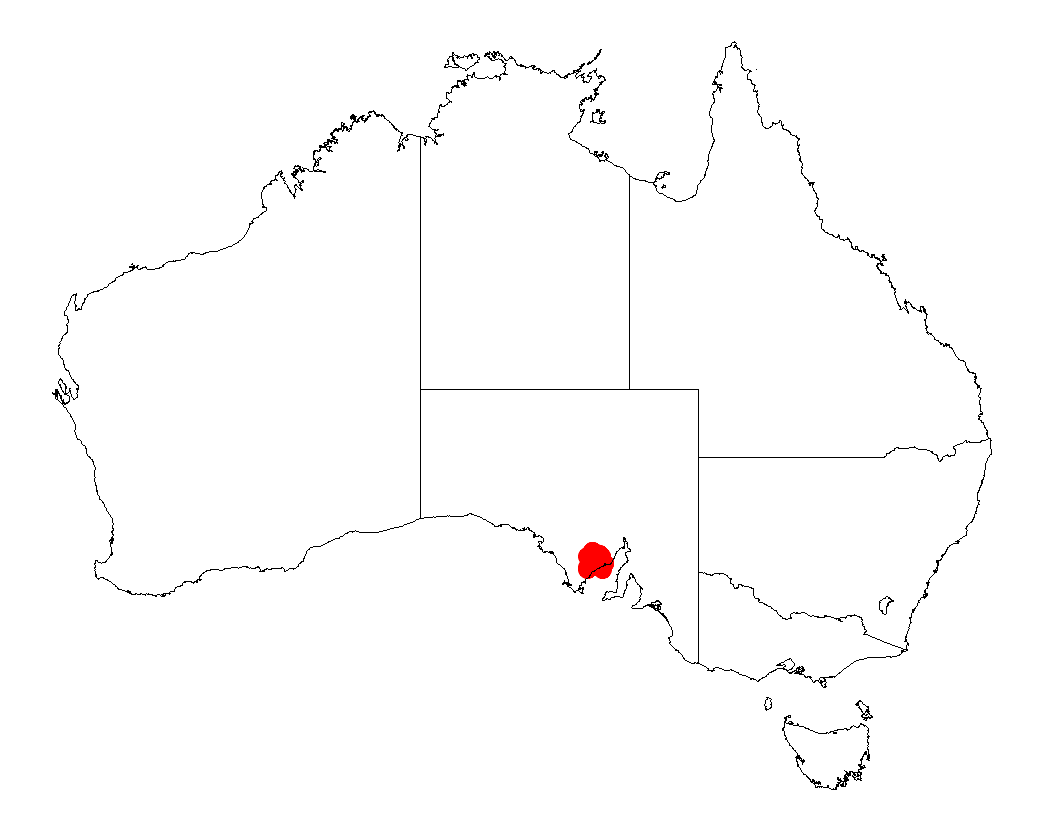
- Occurrence data from AVH

Synonyms
- Racosperma hexaneurum (P.J.Lang & R.S.Cowan) Pedley

Species of legume

Acacia hexaneura, also known as Cowell spine-bush, is a species of flowering plant in the family Fabaceae and is endemic to South Australia. It is a dense, spreading, rigid shrub with sessile, linear, rigid, sharply pointed phyllodes, spherical heads of golden yellow flowers and linear, crusty pods.

== Description ==
Acacia hexaneura is a dense, spreading rigid shrub that typically grows to a height of 1.0–1.5 mm (0.039–0.059 in) and has strongly ribbed branchlets when young. Its phyllodes are sessile, mostly spreading, straight, 5–23 mm (0.20–0.91 in) long, 1–2 mm (0.039–0.079 in) wide and sharply pointed with two veins on each face. The flowers are borne in one or two spherical heads in axils, the heads 4–6 mm (0.16–0.24 in) in diameter with 13 to 25 golden yellow flowers. Flowering occurs from July to September and the pods are linear, wavy, curved to irregularly bent and folded, up to 90 mm (3.5 in) long, 2.0–3.3 mm (0.079–0.130 in) wide and crusty, slightly raised over the seeds. The seeds are elliptic, 2.5–3.5 mm (0.098–0.138 in) long, light red-brown to dar greenish white with a white aril.

== Taxonomy ==
Acacia hexaneura was first formally described by Peter J. Lang and Richard Sumner Cowan in the Journal of the Adelaide Botanic Gardens from specimens collected 45 km (28 mi) south of Kimba, near the County of Jervois#Hundred of James on the Eyre Peninsula in 1984. The specific epithet (hexaneura) is derived from the Greek words hex meaning six and neura meaning nerves in reference to the six nerves running along the length of the phyllodes.

== Distribution and habitat ==
Cowell spine-bush has a limited distribution in the north eastern part of the Eyre Peninsula of South Australia from around Kimba and Cowell where it is usually found on small quartzite hills, often with limestone or ironstone bedrock and growing in gravelly loams and sandy soils that are well drained.

== See also ==
- List of Acacia species
