= Buckleboo =

- Town
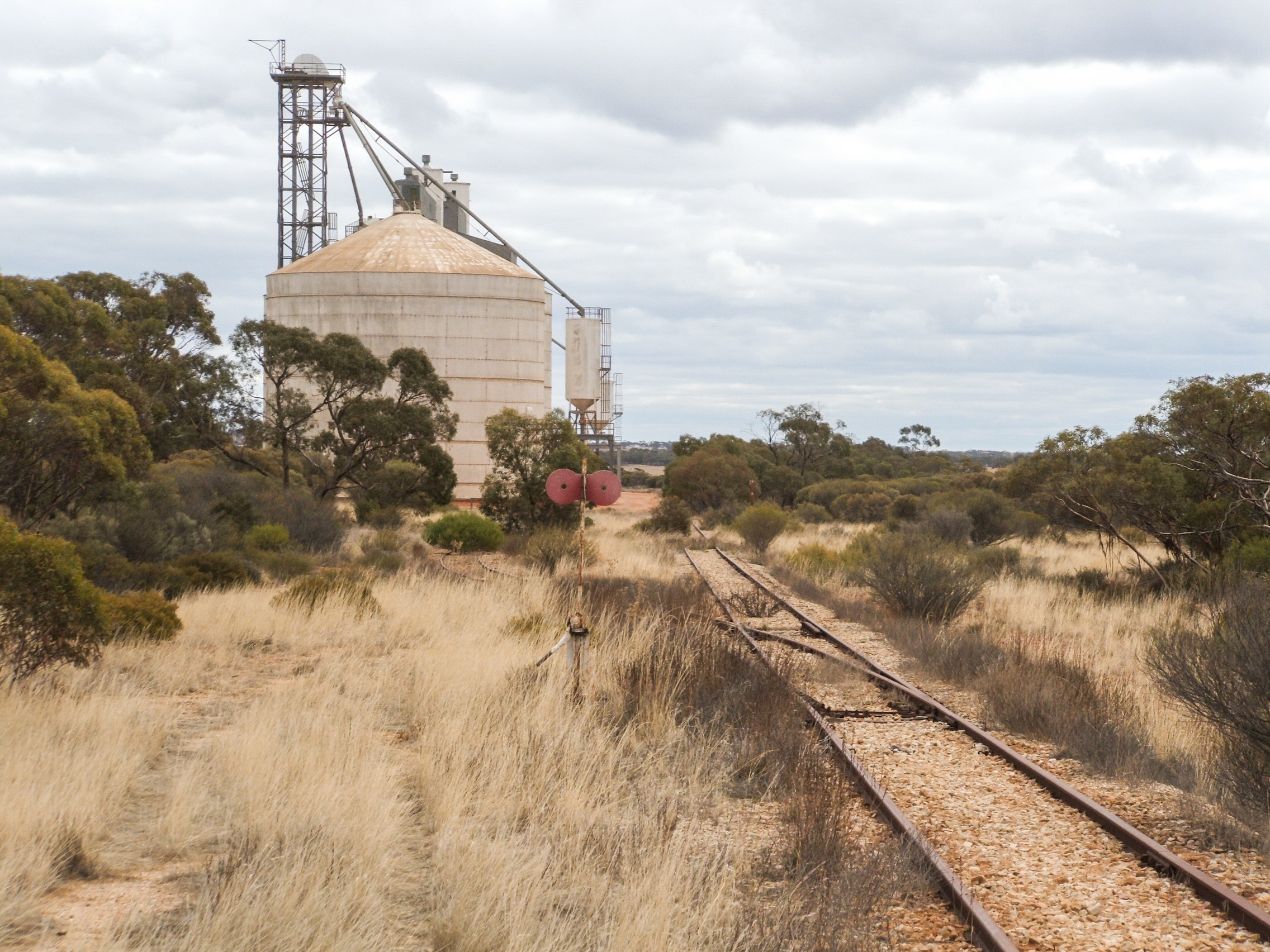
- Former grain silos on Buckleboo Railway

- Coordinates: 32°55′19″S 136°12′42″E
- Country: Australia
- State: South Australia
- Region: Far North; Eyre Western
- LGAs: District Council of Kimba; Pastoral Unincorporated Area
- Location: 313 km (194 mi) north-west of Adelaide; 31 km (19 mi) north-west of Kimba
- Established: 17 December 1925

Government
  - State electorate: Flinders
  - Federal division: Grey

Population
  - Total: 40 (SAL 2021)
- Time zone: UTC+9:30 (ACST)
  - Summer (DST): UTC+10:30 (ACST)
- Postcode: 5641
- County: Buxton
- Mean max temp: 23.6 °C (74.5 °F)
- Mean min temp: 10.3 °C (50.5 °F)
- Annual rainfall: 346.8 mm (13.65 in)
Localities around Buckleboo
| Gawler Ranges | Thurlga; Mount Ive | Nonning |
| Gawler Ranges | Buckleboo | Bungeroo; Cunyarie |
| Pinkawillinie | Pinkawillinie | Cortlinye |

Buckleboo is a locality in the Australian state of South Australia on the Eyre Peninsula located about 313 kilometres (194 mi) northwest of the state capital of Adelaide and about 31 kilometres (19 mi) northwest of the municipal seat of Kimba.

Buckleboo began as a government town, surveyed in November 1924 and proclaimed on 17 December 1925 by Tom Bridges, the Governor of South Australia. It was named after the cadastral unit of the Hundred of Buckleboo. On 27 July 1989, the extent of the government town was reduced by the removal of land north-west of Myrtle Street. Boundaries for the locality were created in 1999, and included the government town of Buckleboo and the former government town of Moongi. In 2013, a parcel of land was removed from the adjoining locality of Pinkawillinie and added to Buckleboo to ensure that the area once covered by the Buckleboo Pastoral Run was within the locality.

Until 2005, Buckleboo was the railhead for one branch of the Eyre Peninsula Railway, a narrow gauge railway which principally hauled grain via Kimba and Cummins to Port Lincoln for export. The silos at the former railway station and the few remaining buildings are surrounded by the Buckleboo Conservation Reserve, proclaimed in 1990.

The locality also includes the Moongi Conservation Reserve further along the railway survey, beyond where tracks were never laid. Moongi also had a school and a Methodist Hall which opened in 1932.

Buckleboo is home to 'Buckleboo Park' which consists of six tennis courts and an oval for Australian rules football and cricket.

Buckleboo is located in the federal division of Grey, and the state electoral district of Flinders. The southern part of the locality is located in the local government area of the District Council of Kimba while the northern part is in the Pastoral Unincorporated Area.

== See also ==
- Kimba, South Australia#Soils and geomorphology
- Kimba, South Australia#Climate
