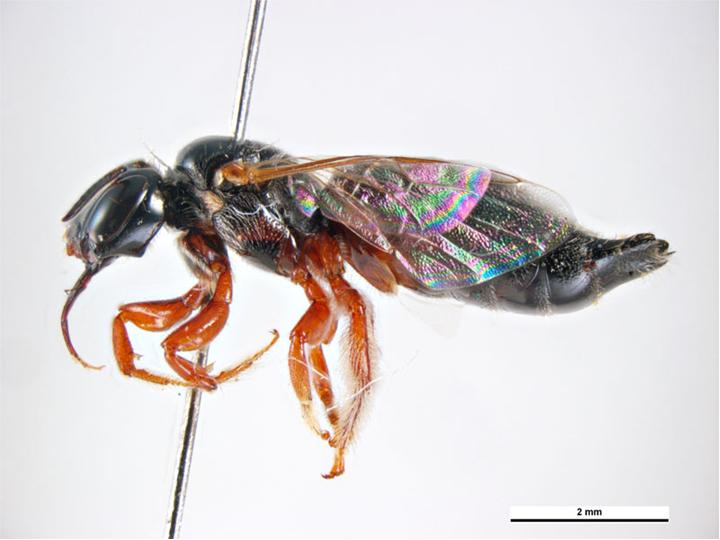
- Female

Scientific classification
- Kingdom: Animalia
- Phylum: Arthropoda
- Clade: Pancrustacea
- Class: Insecta
- Order: Hymenoptera
- Family: Apidae
- Genus: Exoneurella
- Species: E. tridentata

Binomial name
- Exoneurella tridentata (Houston, 1976)

Synonyms
- Exoneura (Exoneurella) tridentata Houston, 1976

= Exoneurella tridentata =

Species of bee

Exoneurella tridentata is a species of bee in the family Apidae and the tribe Allodapini. It is endemic to Australia. It was described in 1976 by Australian entomologist Terry Houston.

== Etymology ==
The specific epithet tridentata (Latin: ‘3-toothed’) is an anatomical reference to the 3-pointed margin of the 6th metasomal tergum of the female.

== Description ==
The body length of males is 4.5–4.9 mm, that of females 4.8–10.0 mm. The head, thorax and abdomen are black.

== Distribution and habitat ==
The species occurs in semi-arid regions of southern Western Australia and South Australia, including mallee woodlands and shrublands. The type locality is Lake Gilles National Park.

== Behaviour ==
The bees nest in disused beetle burrows, as well as dead, dry, pithy plant stems and woody twigs, including those of Acacia and Alectryon, forming small, eusocial colonies with queen and worker castes. All immature stages are found in the communal chamber, with the larvae fed progressively.

The adults are flying mellivores. Flowering plants visited by the bees include Amyema, Eremophila, Eucalyptus, Loranthus, Melaleuca and Myoporum species.

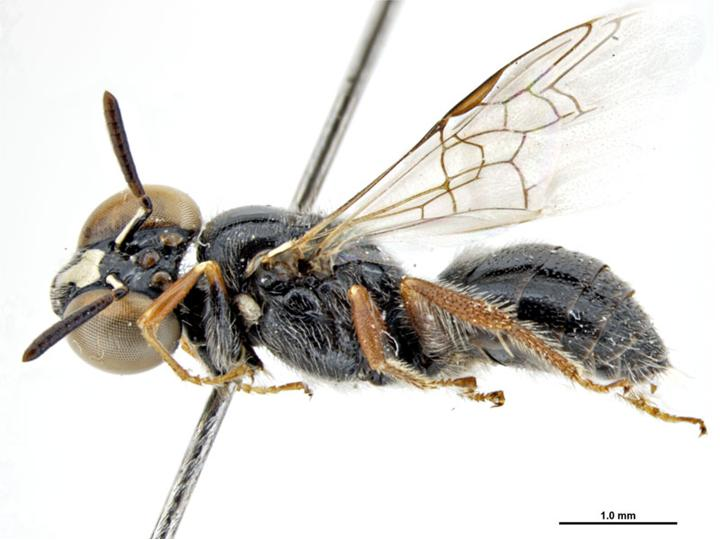
Male
