= Cunyarie, South Australia =

Cunyarie South Australia
- Coordinates: 32.94479718°S 136.27314756°E
- Population: 12 (SAL 2021)
- Established: 1927
- Postcode(s): 5641
- Location: 32 km (20 mi) NW of Kimba
- LGA(s): District Council of Kimba
- State electorate(s): Giles
- Federal division(s): Grey
Localities around Cunyarie:
| Bungeroo | Yeltana | Uno |
| Buckleboo | Cunyarie | Wilcherry |
| Pinkawillinie | Cortlinye | Moseley |

Cunyarie is a locality on northern Eyre Peninsula in South Australia. The Hundred of Cunyarie was proclaimed in 1922 and the town was surveyed in November 1927. Land was released, surveyed and apportioned on an application basis, with the latest sections being surveyed as late as the 1960s and 1970s. However, the limiting factor for early settlers was the availability of water, and allocations were generally preferentially selected around rare rocky outcrops or uplands which could afford some opportunities for increased runoff into earthen dams. Indeed, access to water was a critical factor in European settlement of Eyre Peninsula.

Settlement in the area was spurred by the completion of the railway line to Port Lincoln, which reached Buckleboo (the next town on from Cunyarie, and end of the line) in 1926. The town of Cunyarie was surveyed and proclaimed in 1927-28, but declared as ceased to exist in 1962. The town was named for the railway siding, which was named for the cadastral hundred, which in turn was named after the Cunyarie Rockhole in the area, which provides a pool of water in a sheet of exposed granite.

The remnants of the historic Bienke Farm, located off Whyte Road on what is now part of Yeltana Station, and the Cunyarie Rocks Water Supply Structure are both listed on the South Australian Heritage Register.

The Cunyarie Conservation Reserve is adjacent to the former railway station.
