= Lake Gilles, South Australia =

Lake Gilles South Australia
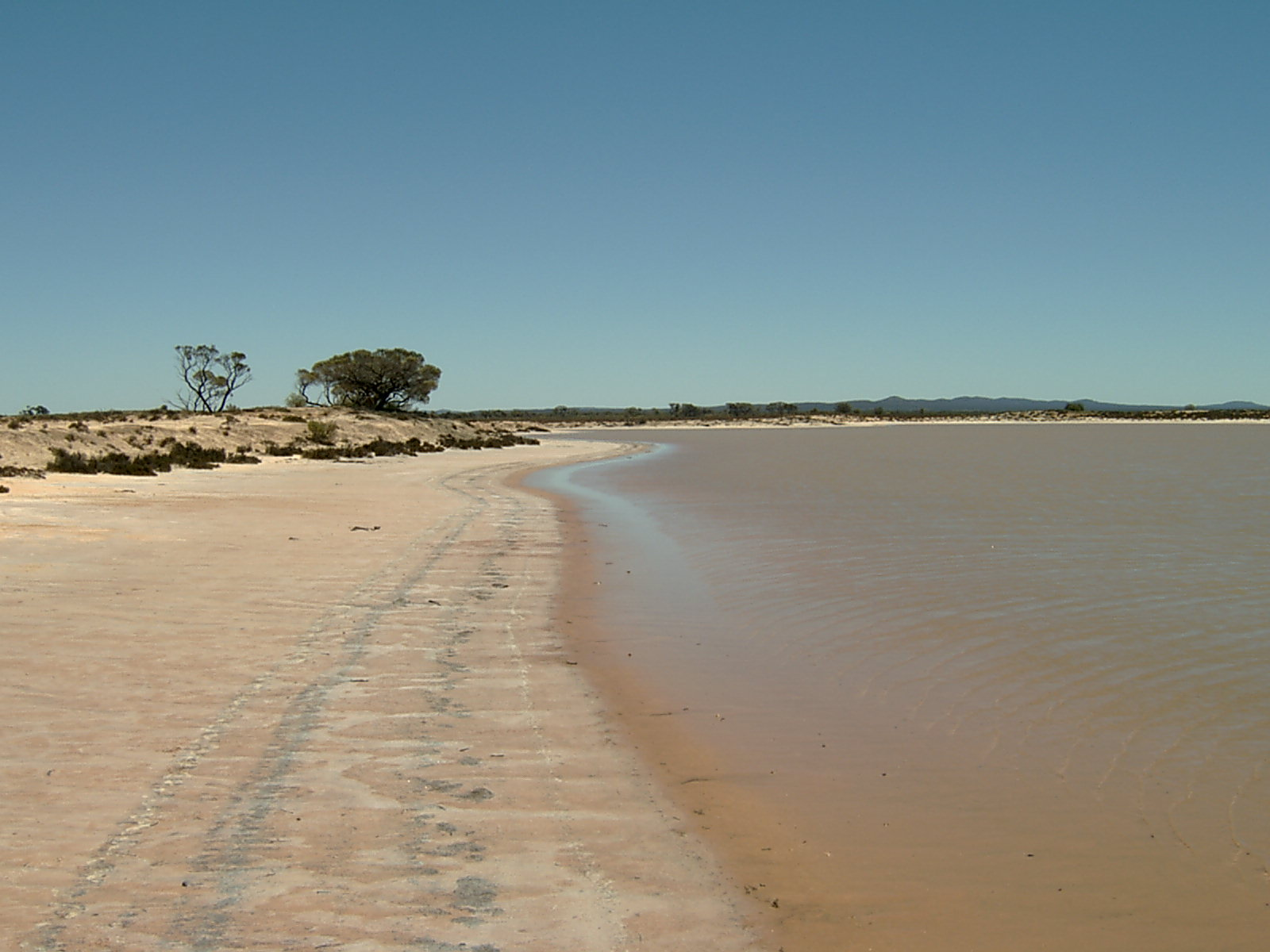
- Lake Gilles (water body)

- Coordinates: 32°57′44″S 136°44′03″E
- Population: 0 (SAL 2016)
- Established: 26 April 2013
- Postcode(s): 5611
- Area: 655.27 km^{2} (253.0 sq mi)
- Time zone: ACST (UTC+9:30)
  - Summer (DST): ACST (UTC+10:30)
- Location: 278 km (173 mi) north-west of Adelaide; 35 km (22 mi) north-east of Kimba
- LGA(s): Pastoral Unincorporated Area; District Council of Kimba
- Region: Far North
- County: Buxton; Hore-Ruthven
- State electorate(s): Giles
- Federal division(s): Grey
Mean max temp	Mean min temp	Annual rainfall
23.7 °C; 75 °F	10.3 °C; 51 °F	344.8 mm 13.6 in
Suburbs around Lake Gilles:
Uno	Uno; Corunna Station	Corunna Station
Uno; Moseley	Lake Gilles	Corunna Station; Gilles Downs; Cooyerdoo
Kelly	Barna	Cooyerdoo
- Footnotes: Location; Adjoining localities

Lake Gilles is a locality in the Australian state of South Australia located on the Eyre Peninsula about 278 kilometres (173 miles) north west of the state capital of Adelaide and about 35 kilometres (22 miles) to the north-east of the town of Kimba.

Lake Gilles consists of the water body known as Lake Gilles and a parcel of land to the lake's immediate south all of which is within the boundaries of the protected area, the Lake Gilles Conservation Park. Accordingly, the sole land use within the locality is conservation. The section of the Eyre Highway between Kimba in the west and Iron Knob in the east passes through the locality.

The locality was established on 26 April 2013 in respect to “the long established local name.” Its name is derived from the lake of the same name which is located within the boundaries of the locality.

Lake Gilles is located within the federal Division of Grey, the state electoral district of Giles, the District Council of Kimba, the Pastoral Unincorporated Area of South Australia and the state’s Far North region.
