= Secret Rocks, South Australia =

Secret Rocks
- Coordinates: 33.25°S 136.89°E
- Country: Australia
- State: South Australia
- Region: Far North
- LGA: Pastoral Unincorporated Area
- Location: 227 km (141 mi) north west of Adelaide; 36 km (22 mi) east of Kimba
- Established: 2013

Government
  - State electorate: Giles
  - Federal division: Grey
- Time zone: UTC+9:30 (ACST)
  - Summer (DST): UTC+10:30 (ACST)
- Postcode: 5600
- County: York
Localities around Secret Rocks
Barna	Cooyerdoo	Cooyerdoo
Yalanda	Secret Rocks	Middleback Range
Miltalia	Minbrie	Minbrie
- Coordinates; Adjoining localities

Secret Rocks is a locality in the Australian state of South Australia located on the Eyre Peninsula about 36 kilometres (22 miles) to the east of the town of Kimba and about 227 kilometres (141 miles) north west of the state capital of Adelaide.

The locality was established on 26 April 2013 in respect to “the long established local name.” Its name is derived from the former pastoral lease of the same name.

The land use within Secret Rocks is concerned with the use of the former pastoral lease as a protected area known as the Secret Rocks Nature Reserve which fully occupies its extent as of 2010.

The Refuge Rockholes Historic Reserve (Secret Rocks) is listed on the South Australian Heritage Register.

Secret Rocks is located within the federal Division of Grey, the state electoral district of Giles, the Pastoral Unincorporated Area of South Australia and the state’s Far North region.

== History ==
During his crossing from Western Australia to Adelaide in 1841, explorer Edward John Eyre was very relieved to discover fresh water at a location he named "Refuge Rocks". In his Journal he wrote an account of his arrival at what is now better known as Secret Rocks:

"September 22.--Moving on the party for ten miles at a course of S. 35 degrees W., we passed through a dreadful country, composed of dense scrub and heavy sandy ridges, with some salt water channels and beds of small dry lakes at intervals. In many cases the margins bounding these were composed of a kind of decomposed lime, very light and loose, which yielded to the slightest pressure; in this our horses and drays sank deep, throwing out as they went, clouds of fine white dust on every side around them. This, added to the very fatiguing and harassing work of dragging the dray through the thick scrub and over the heavy sand ridges, almost knocked them up, and we had the sad prospect before us of encamping at night without a blade of grass for them to eat. Just at this juncture the native boy who was with me, said he saw rocks in one of the distant sand hills, but upon examining the place with a telescope I could not make out distinctly whether they were rocks or only sand. The boy however persisted that there were rocks, and to settle the point I halted the dray in camp, whilst I proceeded with him to the spot to look.

At seven miles W. 10 degrees S. of the drays we reached the ridge, and to my great delight I found the boy was right; he had seen the bare sheets of granite peeping out near the summit of a sandy elevation, and in these we found many holes with water in them. At the base of the hill too, was an opening with good grass around, and a fine spring of pure water. Hastening back to the dray, I conducted the party to the hills, which I named Refuge Rocks, for such they were to us in our difficulties, and such they may be to many future travellers who may have to cross this dreary desert."
