= Ironstone Hill Conservation Park =

Protected area in South Australia

- IUCN category VI (protected area with sustainable use of natural resources)
- Location within South Australia
- Location: South Australia
- Nearest city: Kimba
- Coordinates: 33°14′51.35″S 137°2′26.87″E
- Area: 196.50 km^{2} (75.87 sq mi)
- Established: 26 August 2010
- Governing body: Department for Environment and Water

Ironstone Hill Conservation Park is a protected area in the Australian state of South Australia located on the Eyre Peninsula in the gazetted locality of Middleback Range about 53 kilometres (33 miles) east south-east of the town of Kimba on the west side of the Middleback Range.

The conservation park was proclaimed under the National Parks and Wildlife Act 1972 in 2010 and was constituted to permit access under the state's Mining Act 1971 and Petroleum and Geothermal Energy Act 2000.

In 2014, it was described as follows:

Ironstone Hill Conservation Park (19 650 ha) is particularly significant for the protection of sandy dunes, which are preferred habitat of the endangered Sandhill Dunnart. The park (sic) is largely mallee vegetation, and protects plant species including the Desert Greenhood and Sandalwood which are listed as vulnerable under the National Parks and Wildlife Act.

The conservation park is bounded on its western side by the private protected area, the Secret Rocks Nature Reserve. The waste-rock dump of Arrium's Iron Duke mine is located immediately to the east of the conservation park.

Ironstone Hill Conservation is classified as an IUCN Category VI protected area.

== See also ==
- Protected areas of South Australia
