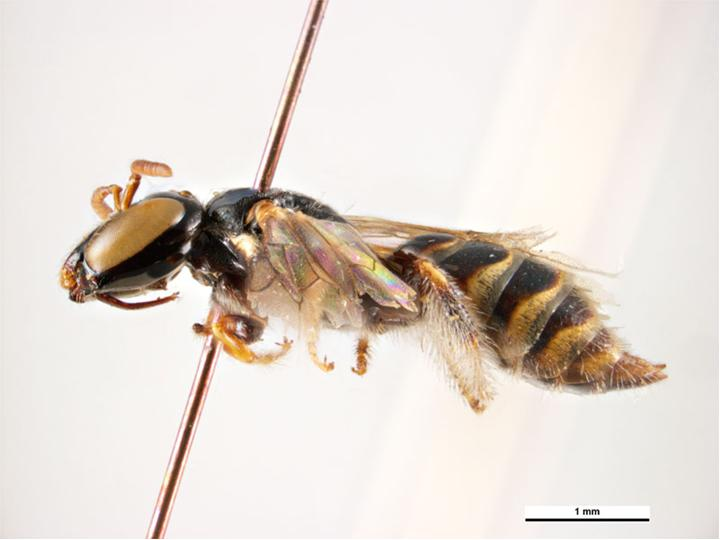
- Female

Scientific classification
- Kingdom: Animalia
- Phylum: Arthropoda
- Clade: Pancrustacea
- Class: Insecta
- Order: Hymenoptera
- Family: Apidae
- Genus: Exoneurella
- Species: E. eremophila

Binomial name
- Exoneurella eremophila (Houston, 1976)

Synonyms
- Exoneura (Exoneurella) eremophila Houston, 1976

= Exoneurella eremophila =

Species of bee

Exoneurella eremophila, also known as the desert reed bee, is a species of bee in the family Apidae and the tribe Allodapini. It is endemic to Australia. It was described in 1976 by Australian entomologist Terry Houston.

== Etymology ==
The specific epithet eremophila (Greek: ‘loving solitude’) alludes to the arid habitat.

== Description ==
The body length of males is 3.8–4.1 mm, that of females 4.0–5.5 mm. The head and thorax are black, the abdomen yellow-brown and black.

== Distribution and habitat ==
The species occurs in central and eastern inland Australia. The type locality is New Kalamurina Homestead in north-eastern South Australia.

== Behaviour ==
The bees nest in dead, dry, pithy plant stems, including those of Crotalaria and Myriocephalus. They are basically subsocial, with each female founding and maintaining her own nest. Occasionally two or more females may oviposit and rear brood together in one nest. All immature stages are found in the communal chamber, with the larvae fed progressively.

The adults are flying mellivores. Flowering plants visited by the bees include Calandrinia, Eremophila, Goodenia, Hakea, Helichrysum, Hibiscus, Myriocephalus, Ptilotus, Scaevola and Wahlenbergia species.

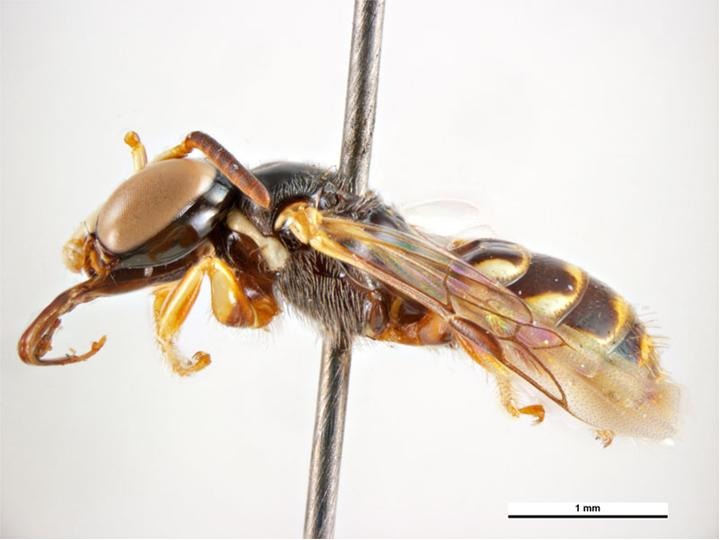
Male
