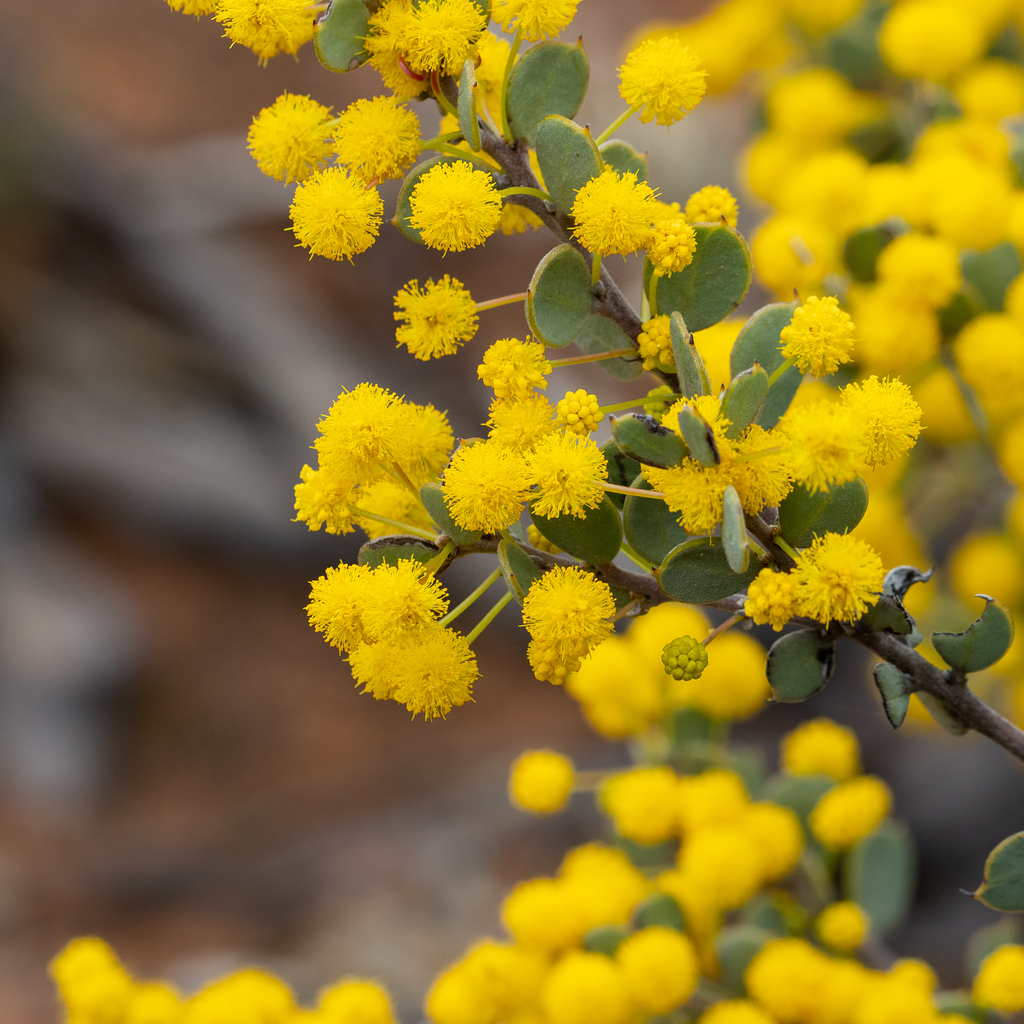
- Near Moseley

Scientific classification
- Kingdom: Plantae
- Clade: Tracheophytes
- Clade: Angiosperms
- Clade: Eudicots
- Clade: Rosids
- Order: Fabales
- Family: Fabaceae
- Subfamily: Caesalpinioideae
- Clade: Mimosoid clade
- Genus: Acacia
- Species: A. merrallii

Binomial name
- Acacia merrallii F.Muell.
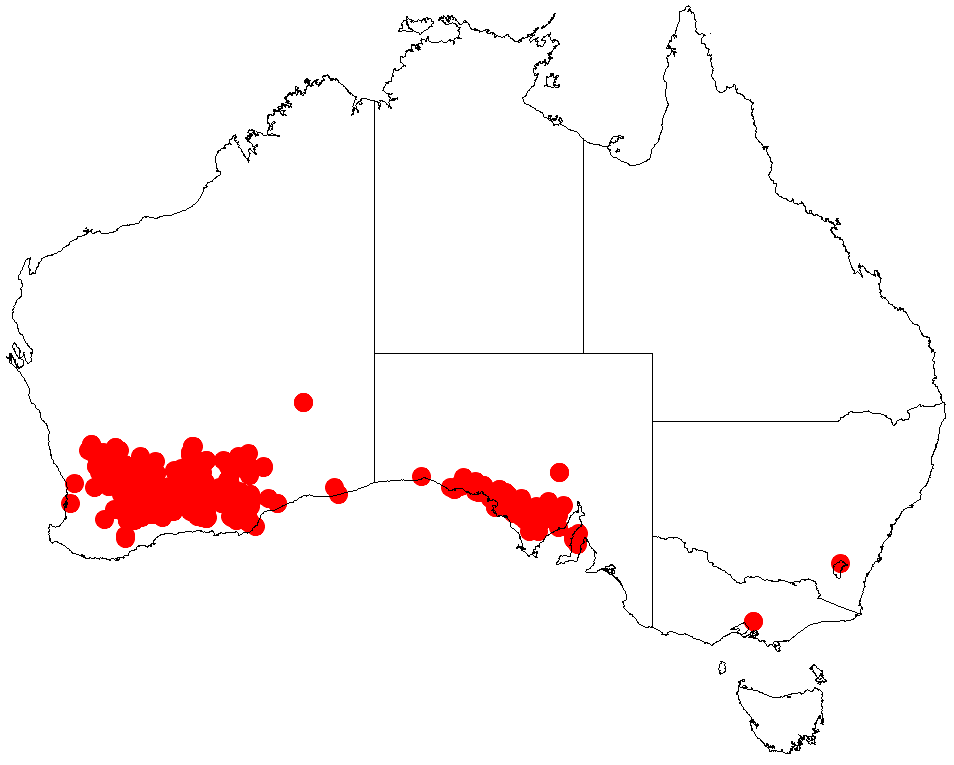
- Occurrence data from AVH

Synonyms
- Acacia dubia W.Fitzg. nom. illeg.; Acacia merrallii F.Muell. var. merrallii; Racosperma merrallii (F.Muell.) Pedley

= Acacia merrallii =

Merrall's wattle

Species of legume

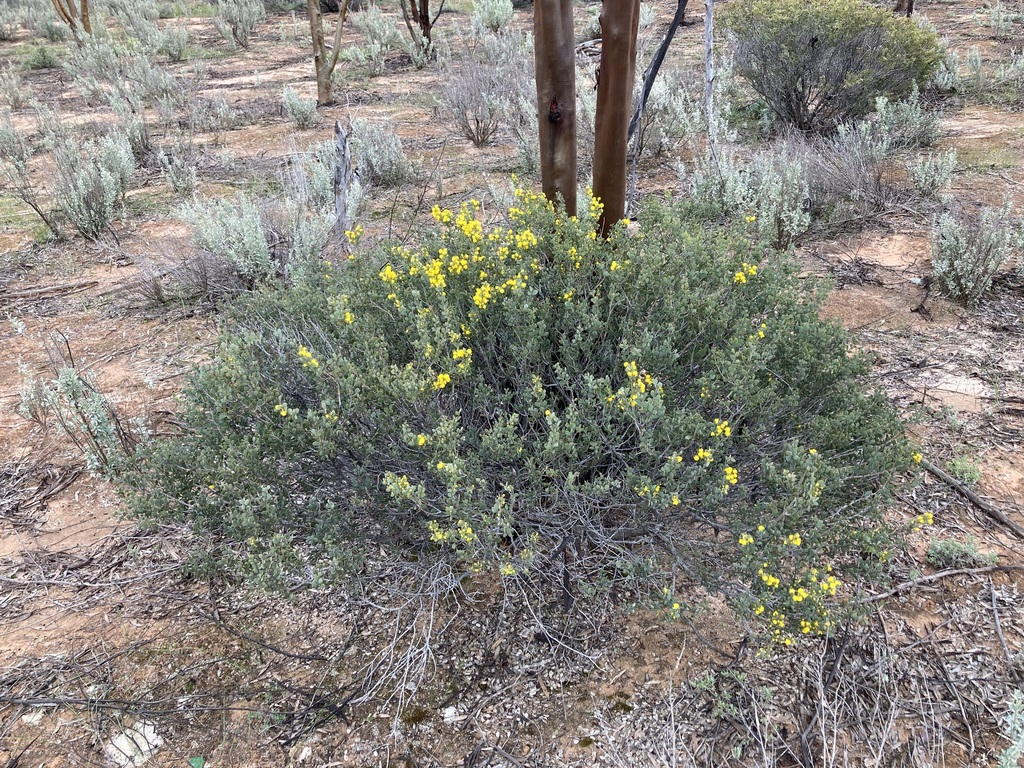
Habit near Hines Hill

Acacia merrallii, commonly known as Merrall's wattle, is a species of flowering plant in the family Fabaceae and is endemic to south-western Australia. It is a dense, more or less rounded, spreading shrub, usually with hairy branchlets, obliquely egg-shaped to elliptic or oblong phyllodes, spherical heads of golden yellow flowers, and curved to irregularly coiled, thinly leathery to crusty pods.

== Description ==
Acacia merrallii is a dense, more or less rounded, spreading to low-lying or mound-like shrub that typically grows to a height of 0.3–2 m (1 ft 0 in – 6 ft 7 in), its branchlets covered with minute soft, straight or slightly curved hairs. Its phyllodes are obliquely egg-shaped, usually with the narrower end towards the base, or elliptic or oblong, 8–25 mm (0.31–0.98 in) long, 5–17 mm (0.20–0.67 in) wide, leathery, often slightly wavy, and grey-green to glaucous. There is a curved or straight, sometimes sharply pointed tip on the end of the phyllodes and a gland on the lower half. The flowers are borne in up to three spherical heads on peduncles 6–18 mm (0.24–0.71 in) long, each head 4–5 mm (0.16–0.20 in) in diameter with 22 to 35 golden yellow flowers. Flowering occurs from August to October and the pods are curved to irregularly coiled, semi-terete, up to 20 mm (0.79 in) long, 2–3 mm (0.079–0.118 in) wide, thinly leathery to crusty, dark brown to black and more or less glabrous. The seeds are bout 2.5 mm (0.098 in) long with a conspicuous, usually orange aril.

== Taxonomy ==
Acacia merrallii was first formally described in 1890 by Ferdinand von Mueller in the Proceedings of the Linnean Society of New South Wales from specimens collected near Yilgarn by the gold prospector, Edwin Merrall. The specific epithet (merrallii) honours the collector of the type specimen.

== Distribution and habitat ==
Merrall's wattle grows in clay, sandy clay, sand, sandy loam and clay loam on low-lying areas, plains and near salt lakes from near Wubin to Pingrup and Madura, in the Avon Wheatbelt, Coolgardie, Hampton, Mallee, Murchison and Nullarbor bioregions of Western Australia, and the Eyre Yorke Block, Gawler bioregion, Great Victoria Desert and Nullarbor bioregions of South Australia.

== Use in horticulture ==
The shrub is available commercially where it can be planted as an ornamental plant suitable for low maintenance areas where it can be employed as an understorey shrub in mixed plantings and along roadside verges or on median strips as a wind-break, natural barrier or erosion control. It can be planted close to the coast line or in hills or on plains in full sun or part shade and can tolerate drought and moderate frosts. It is both bird and insect attracting.

== See also ==
- List of Acacia species
