= Kelly, South Australia =

Kelly South Australia
- Coordinates: 33°11′20″S 136°32′46″E
- Population: 59 (SAL 2021)
- Established: 6 May 1999
- Postcode(s): 5641
- Time zone: ACST (UTC+9:30)
  - Summer (DST): ACST (UTC+10:30)
- Location: 270 km (168 mi) NW of Adelaide; 13 km (8 mi) SE of Kimba
- LGA(s): District Council of Kimba
- Region: Eyre Western
- County: Buxton
- State electorate(s): Giles
- Federal division(s): Grey
Mean max temp	Mean min temp	Annual rainfall
23.7 °C; 75 °F	10.3 °C; 51 °F	344.8 mm 13.6 in
Suburbs around Kelly:
Kimba	Kimba; Moseley	Lake Gilles
Kimba; Solomon	Kelly	Barna; Yalanda
Waddikee	Waddikee; Mangalo	Mangalo
- Footnotes: Locations; Adjoining localities

Kelly is a locality in the Australian state of South Australia located on the Eyre Peninsula about 270 kilometres (170 mi) north-west of the state capital of Adelaide and about 13 kilometres (8.1 mi) south-east of the municipal seat in Kimba.

Kelly's boundaries were created on 6 May 1999 for the “local established name”. On 1 August 2017, a parcel of land was taken from the adjoining locality of Mangalo and added to the locality of Kelly to ensure that all of land identified as “Allotment 50, in Deposited Plan 68070” was in the locality. The 2017 boundary change resulted in all of the locality's boundaries now aligning with those of the cadastral unit of the Hundred of Kelly with exception to the boundary with the locality of Kimba in the hundred's north-west corner.

Land use within the locality is ’primary production’ with exception to land dedicated to the protected area known as the Malgra Conservation Park.

Kelly is located within the federal division of Grey, the state electoral district of Giles and the local government area of the District Council of Kimba.
