= Buxton (disambiguation) =

Buxton is a town in Derbyshire, England.

Buxton may also refer to:

== Places ==
Australia

- Buxton, Victoria
- Buxton, New South Wales
- County of Buxton, a cadastral unit in South Australia

Bulgaria

- Buxton, Sofia

Canada

- South Buxton, Ontario
- Buxton National Historic Site and Museum, Ontario

Guyana

- Buxton, Guyana

Seychelles

- Mont Buxton

United Kingdom

- Buxton, Norfolk

United States of America

- Buxton, Iowa, a historic African-American coal mining camp
- Buxton, Kansas
- Buxton, Maine
- Buxton, Mississippi
- Buxton, North Carolina
- Buxton, North Dakota
- Buxton, Oregon
- Buxton Park Arboretum, Indianola, Iowa

== People ==
- Buxton (surname), a surname, and a list of people with the surname
- Buxton Orr, a composer

== Brands and enterprises ==
- Buxton Blue, a type of cheese
- Buxton, a bottled mineral water produced by Nestlé, whose source is in Buxton, Derbyshire

== Education ==
- Buxton & Leek College
- Buxton School (disambiguation)
- Buxton University

== Other uses ==
- Buxton Festival, an annual arts festival held in Buxton
- Buxton Hitmen, a speedway team
- Buxton's jird, a species of rodent
- DR DOS "Buxton", the code-name of Digital Research's DR DOS 6.0
- Buxton the Blue Cat, a character in the film Dougal and the Blue Cat
- Governor Scott Buxton, fictional British governor of India in the 2022 Indian film RRR
- Buxton & Lewis, a British mountain classification

== See also ==
- Buckston (disambiguation)
