= Buckston =

Buckston may refer to:

- Buckston Browne (1850–1945), a British surgeon and urology pioneer
- George Buckston (1881–1942), an English cricketer
- Robin Buckston (1908–1967), an English cricketer

== See also ==
- Bradbourne Hall, ancestral home of the Buxton/Buckston family
- Buxton (disambiguation)
