= Exoneurella micheneri =

Scientific classification
- Kingdom: Animalia
- Phylum: Arthropoda
- Clade: Pancrustacea
- Class: Insecta
- Order: Hymenoptera
- Family: Apidae
- Genus: Exoneurella
- Species: E. micheneri

Binomial name
- Exoneurella micheneri Dew, Stevens & Schwarz, 2018

Species of bee

Exoneurella micheneri is a species of bee in the family Apidae and the tribe Allodapini, commonly known as reed bees. It is endemic to Australia. It was described in 2018 by R.M. Dew, M.I. Stevens and M.P. Schwarz.

== Distribution and habitat ==
The species occurs in south-west Western Australia in the Warren bioregion. The type locality is Gardner State Forest. It has also been recorded from Northcliffe.
