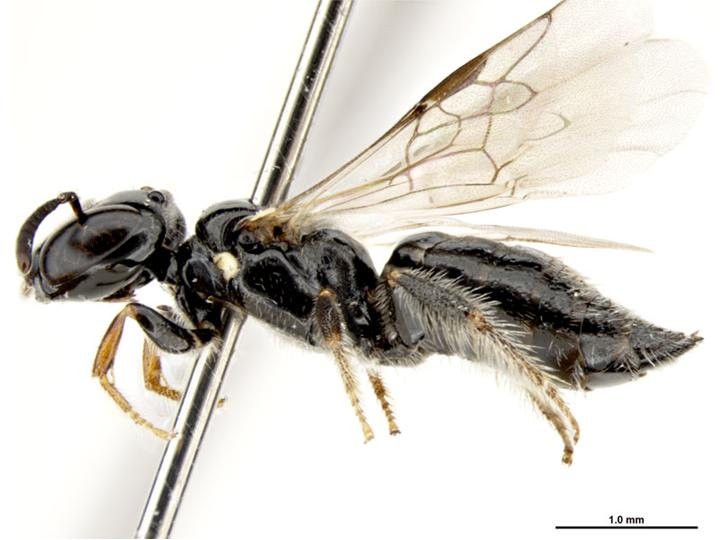
- Female

Scientific classification
- Kingdom: Animalia
- Phylum: Arthropoda
- Clade: Pancrustacea
- Class: Insecta
- Order: Hymenoptera
- Family: Apidae
- Genus: Exoneurella
- Species: E. lawsoni

Binomial name
- Exoneurella lawsoni (Rayment, 1946)

Synonyms
- Exoneura lawsoni Rayment, 1946

= Exoneurella lawsoni =

Species of bee

Exoneurella lawsoni is a species of bee in the family Apidae and the tribe Allodapini. It is endemic to Australia. It was described in 1946 by Australian entomologist Tarlton Rayment as a species of Exoneura, but subsequently placed by American entomologist Charles Duncan Michener into the new genus Exoneurella.

== Description ==
The body length of the holotype male is 4.5 mm. The head, thorax and abdomen are glossy black.

== Distribution and habitat ==
The species occurs in south-eastern Australia. The type locality is Canberra in the Australian Capital Territory.

== Behaviour ==
The adults are flying mellivores. They nest in dead, dry plant stems, including those of Hydrangea and Verbena. The bees are basically subsocial, with each female founding and maintaining her own nest. All immature stages are found in the communal chamber, with the larvae fed progressively. Flowering plants visited by the bees include Wahlenbergia species.

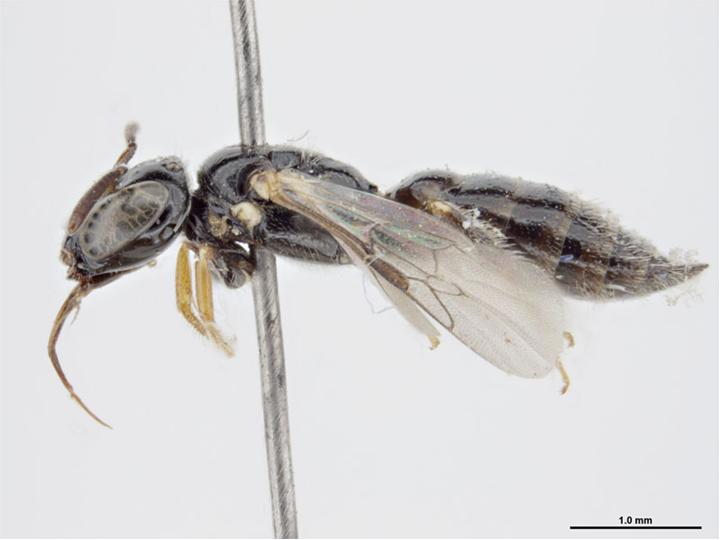
Male
