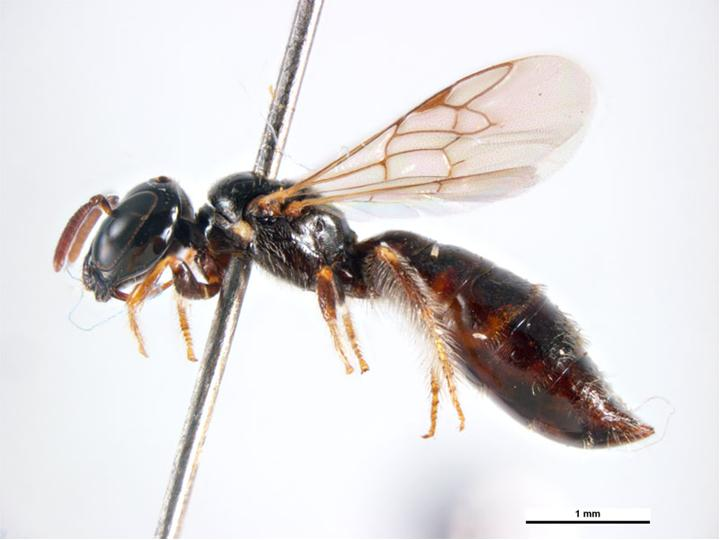
- Female

Scientific classification
- Kingdom: Animalia
- Phylum: Arthropoda
- Clade: Pancrustacea
- Class: Insecta
- Order: Hymenoptera
- Family: Apidae
- Genus: Exoneurella
- Species: E. setosa

Binomial name
- Exoneurella setosa (Houston, 1976)

Synonyms
- Exoneura (Exoneurella) setosa Houston, 1976

= Exoneurella setosa =

Species of bee

Exoneurella setosa is a species of bee in the family Apidae and the tribe Allodapini. It is endemic to Australia. It was described in 1976 by Australian entomologist Terry Houston.

== Etymology ==
The specific epithet setosa (Latin: ‘bristly’) refers to the metasomal setae.

== Description ==
The body length of males is 3.8–4.7 mm, that of females 4.3–5.5 mm. The head and thorax are black; the abdomen black, banded cream.

== Distribution and habitat ==
The species occurs in south-eastern Queensland and the lowlands of southern South Australia. The type locality is West Beach, Adelaide.

== Behaviour ==
The bees nest in dead, dry, pithy plant stems, including those of Cakile, Euphorbia, Foeniculum and Geranium. They are weakly social, with each female founding and maintaining her own nest. Occasionally two or more females may oviposit and rear brood together in one nest. All immature stages are found in the communal chamber, with the larvae fed progressively.

The adults are flying mellivores. As well as Cakile and Geranium, flowering plants visited by the bees include Carpobrotus, Reichardia and Wahlenbergia species.

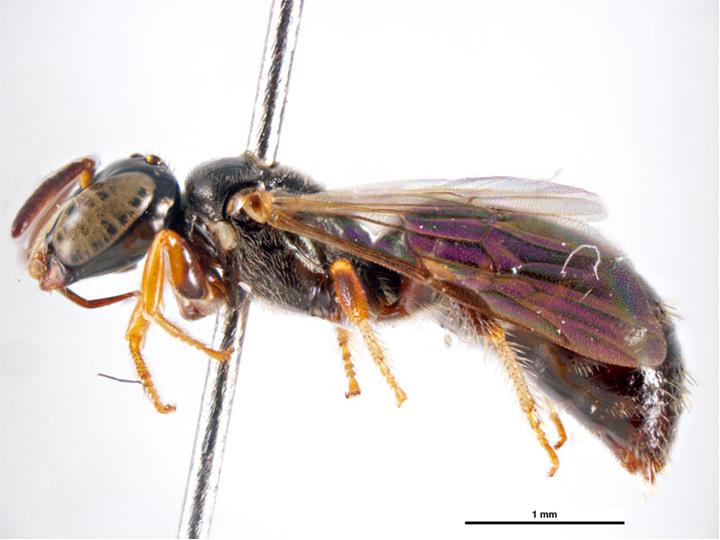
Male
