= Kemba =

Kemba may refer to:

== Arts and entertainment ==
- Kemba (film), a 2024 American biographical drama about Kemba Smith (see below)
- KEMBA Live!, a concert venue in Columbus, Ohio

== Places ==
- Kemba (woreda), Ethiopia
- Kemba, Estonia, a village in Kuusalu Parish, Harju County

== People ==
- Kemba (rapper) (born 1990), American musical artist
- Kemba Nelson (born 2000), Jamaican sprinter
- Kemba Smith Pradia (born 1971), American prison-reform advocate
- Kemba Walden, American lawyer
- Kemba Walker (born 1990), American basketball player

== See also ==
- Kimba (disambiguation)
