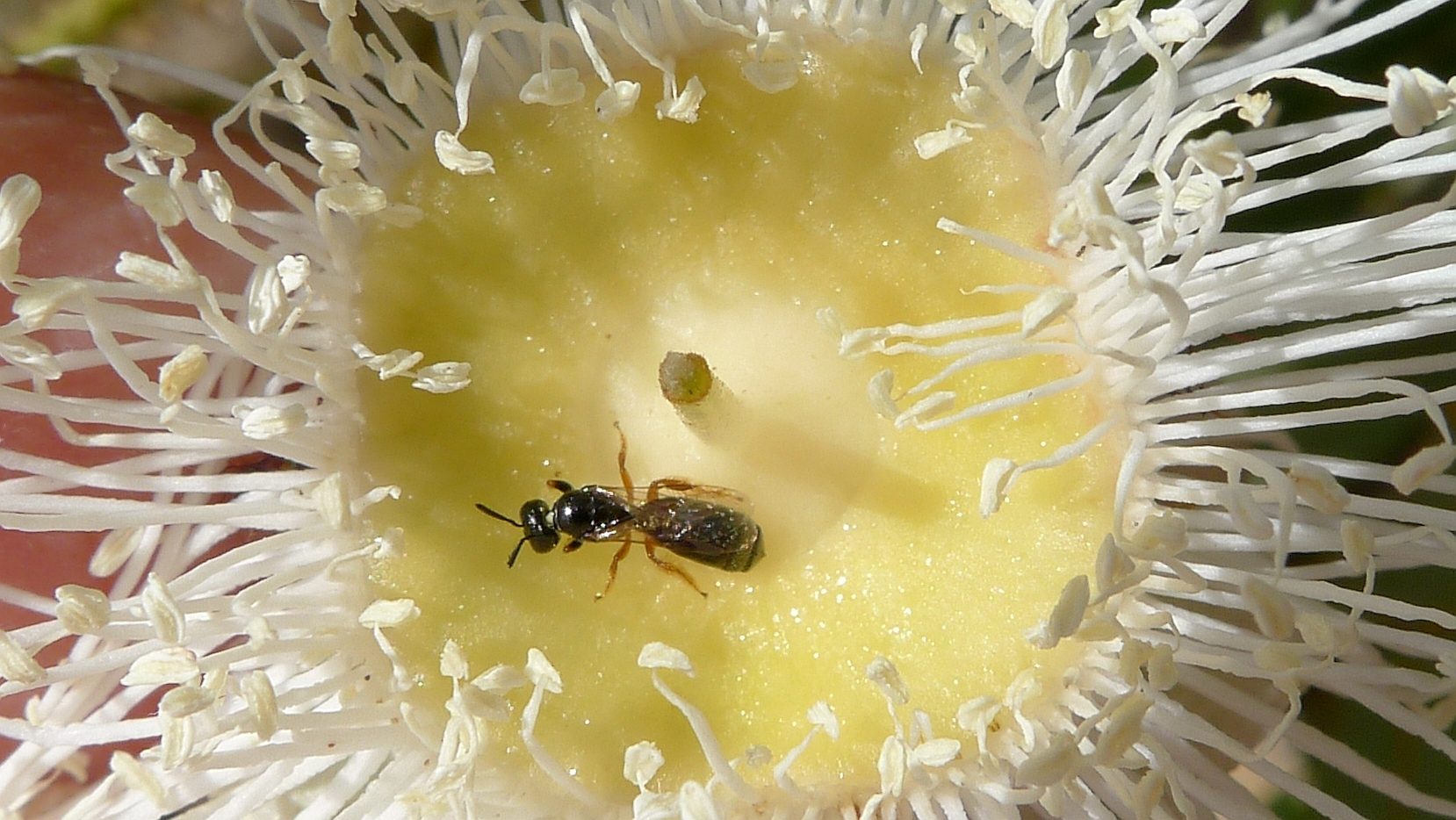
- Exoneurella lawsoni

Scientific classification
- Kingdom: Animalia
- Phylum: Arthropoda
- Clade: Pancrustacea
- Class: Insecta
- Order: Hymenoptera
- Clade: Anthophila
- Family: Apidae
- Subfamily: Xylocopinae
- Tribe: Allodapini
- Genus: Exoneurella; Michener, 1963

= Exoneurella =

Genus of bees

Exoneurella is a genus of bees in the family Apidae and the tribe Allodapini. It is endemic to Australia. It was described in 1963 by American entomologist Charles Duncan Michener. The genus is closely related to Exoneura, the reed bees. Michener says of the behavioural differences:

"The immature stages of Exoneurella live together in a hollow pithy stem as in Exoneura and not in separate cells as in Ceratina. The individual females are solitary, not forming associations of several adult females in a single nest such as occur in Exoneura and Allodapula.

== Species ==
As of 2026 the genus contained five valid species:

- Exoneurella eremophila (Houston, 1976)
- Exoneurella lawsoni (Rayment, 1946)
- Exoneurella micheneri Dew, Stevens & Schwarz, 2018
- Exoneurella setosa (Houston, 1976)
- Exoneurella tridentata (Houston, 1976)
