= Kimba Airport =

Airport in Moseley, South Australia

- IATA: none; ICAO: YIMB

Summary
- Airport type: Public
- Operator: Kimba District Council
- Location: Moseley
- Elevation AMSL: 763 ft / 233 m
- Coordinates: 33°05′59″S 136°27′35″E

Map
- Location in South Australia

Runways
Direction	Length		Surface
Direction	m	ft	Surface
15/33	1,307	4,288	Clay/sand
03/21	1,580	5,184	Clay/sand
- Sources: Australian AIP and aerodrome chart

Kimba Airport (ICAO: YIMB) is an airport located 3.5 nautical miles (6.5 km; 4.0 mi) northeast of Kimba, South Australia in the locality of Moseley.

== See also ==
- List of airports in South Australia
