= Buxton School =

Buxton School may refer to:

- Buxton School, Leytonstone, a state-maintained school in Leytonstone, London, England
- Buxton School (Massachusetts), a private school in Williamstown, Massachusetts, United States

== See also ==
- Buxton (disambiguation)
