= Moseley, South Australia =

Moseley South Australia
- Coordinates: 33°04′11″S 136°32′37″E
- Population: 19 (SAL 2016)
- Established: 6 May 1999
- Postcode(s): 5641
- Time zone: ACST (UTC+9:30)
  - Summer (DST): ACST (UTC+10:30)
- Location: 286 km (178 mi) NW of Adelaide; 14 km (9 mi) NE of Kimba
- LGA(s): District Council of Kimba
- Region: Eyre Western
- County: Buxton
- State electorate(s): Giles
- Federal division(s): Grey
Mean max temp	Mean min temp	Annual rainfall
23.7 °C; 75 °F	10.3 °C; 51 °F	344.8 mm 13.6 in
Suburbs around Moseley:
Cunyarie	Wilcherry; Uno	Lake Gilles
Cortlinye	Moseley	Lake Gilles
Kimba	Kimba; Kelly	Barna
- Footnotes: Locations; Adjoining localities

Moseley is a locality in the Australian state of South Australia located on the Eyre Peninsula about 286 kilometres (178 mi) north-west of the state capital of Adelaide and about 14 kilometres (8.7 mi) north-east of the municipal seat in Kimba.

Moseley’s boundaries were created on 6 May 1999 for the “local established name”. On 26 April 2013, land within the Lake Gilles Conservation Park was removed from Moseley and added to the new locality of Lake Gilles to ensure that all of the conservation park was within the locality of the same name.

Land use within the locality is ’primary production’ with exception to land on its western boundary dedicated as the protected area, the Mootra Conservation Reserve, land in its centre used for the Kimba Aerodrome and land in its south-western corner which has been zoned for use for bulk handling.

Moseley is located within the federal division of Grey, the state electoral district of Giles and the local government area of the District Council of Kimba.
