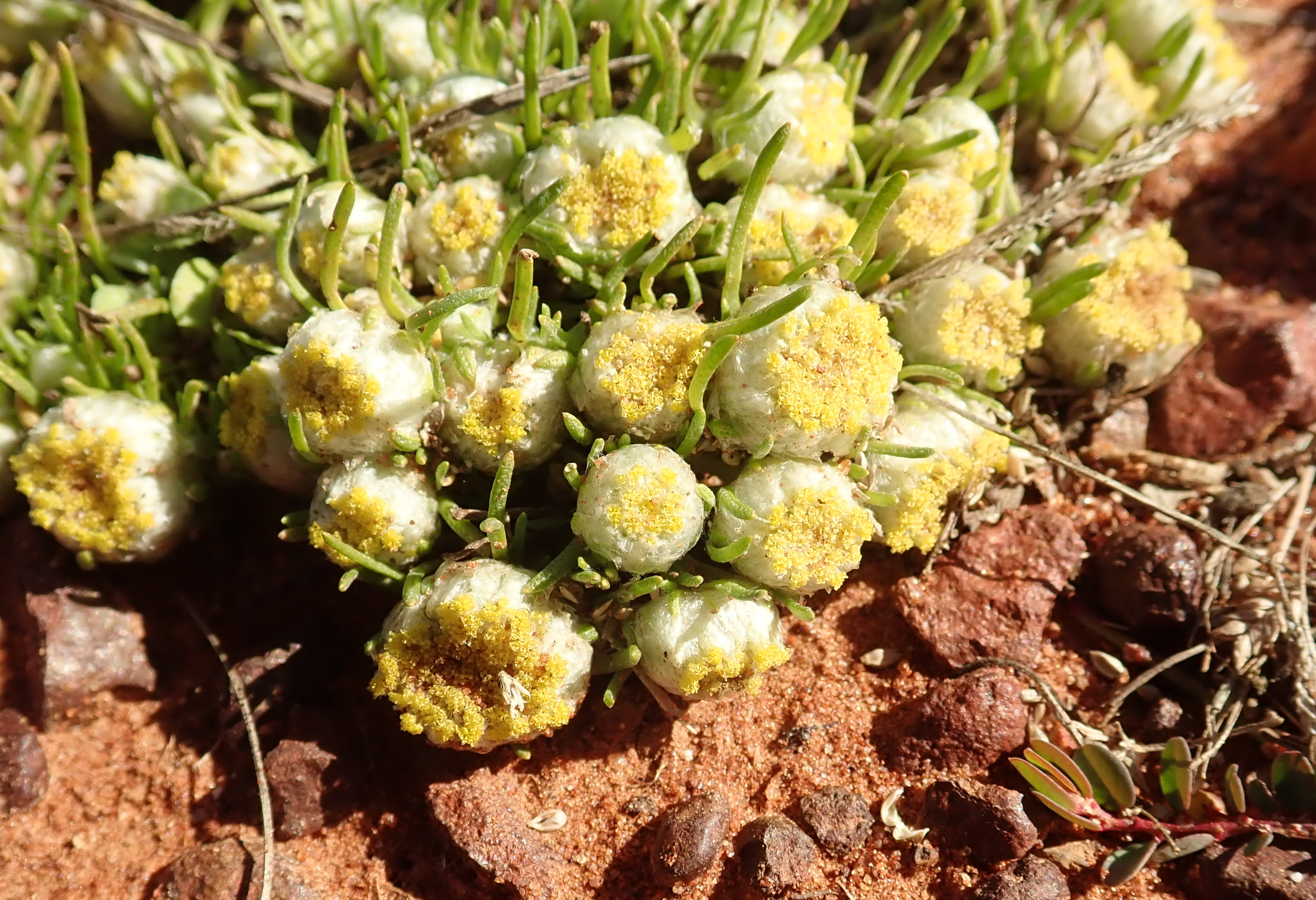
- At Narran Lake Nature Reserve

Scientific classification
- Kingdom: Plantae
- Clade: Tracheophytes
- Clade: Angiosperms
- Clade: Eudicots
- Clade: Asterids
- Order: Asterales
- Family: Asteraceae
- Genus: Myriocephalus
- Species: M. pluriflorus

Binomial name
- Myriocephalus pluriflorus (J.M.Black) D.A.Cooke

Synonyms
- Myriocephalus rhizocephalus var. pluriflorus J.M.Black

= Myriocephalus pluriflorus =

Species of plant

Myriocephalus pluriflorus is a plant in the family Asteraceae, native to Western Australia, South Australia and New South Wales.

It was first described by John McConnell Black in 1929 as Myriocephalus rhizocephalus var. pluriflorus. It was raised to species status in 1986 by David Alan Cooke.
