= Corrobinnie Hill Conservation Park =

Protected area in South Australia

- IUCN category III (natural monument or feature)
- Location within South Australia
- Location: South Australia, Pinkawillinie
- Nearest city: Kyancutta
- Coordinates: 32.9848°S 135.7387°E
- Area: 2.08 km^{2} (0.80 sq mi)
- Established: 25 August 1983
- Governing body: Department for Environment and Water

Corrobinnie Hill Conservation Park is a protected area in the Australian state of South Australia located on the Eyre Peninsula in the gazetted locality of Pinkawillinie about 24 kilometres (15 mi) west of the town centre in Kyancutta.

The conservation park was proclaimed on 25 August 1983 under the state's National Parks and Wildlife Act 1972. Its name was derived from Corrobinnie Hill which is located within its boundaries. As of June 2016, the conservation park covered an area of 2.08 square kilometres (0.80 sq mi).

The land surrounding the conservation park which is crown land and which is described in cadastral terms as “allotment 1 of Deposited Plan No. 33659, Hundred of Hill” was dedicated on 11 November 1993 under the Crown Lands Act 1929 as part of the conservation reserve known as the Pinkawillinie Conservation Reserve. On 21 November 2002, the surrounding land was added by proclamation to the Pinkawillinie Conservation Park.

As of 2010, the conservation park was operated in association with the Pinkawillinie Conservation Park. It can only be accessed by four-wheel drive vehicle only via the “Number 17 Stock Route”. It is reported as being “one of the most popular attractions” in the Pinkawillinie Conservation Park due to the presence of Corrobinnie Hill, a hill “consisting of unusually shaped, weathered, granite rocks”.

The conservation park is classified as an IUCN Category III protected area.

== See also ==
- Protected areas of South Australia
