= Secret Rocks Nature Reserve =

Protected area in South Australia

- IUCN category III (natural monument or feature)
- Location within South Australia
- Location: South Australia
- Nearest city: Kimba
- Coordinates: 33°15′6.68″S 136°53′46.51″E
- Area: 256.47 km^{2} (99.02 sq mi)
- Established: 11 September 2007
- Governing body: Ecological Horizons Pty Ltd
- Website: Official website

Secret Rocks Nature Reserve is a private protected area located in South Australia about 36 kilometres (22 miles) east of the town of Kimba on the Eyre Peninsula in the state's Far North region. The nature reserve has protected area status due being to the subject of a native vegetation heritage agreement created in 2007 under the Native Vegetation Act 1991 (SA) whereby its owner, Ecological Horizons Pty Ltd, has agreed to protect the property's native vegetation in perpetuity. The nature reserve is bounded on its east side by the Ironstone Hill Conservation Park. It is classified as an IUCN Category III protected area.

== See also ==
- Protected areas of South Australia
