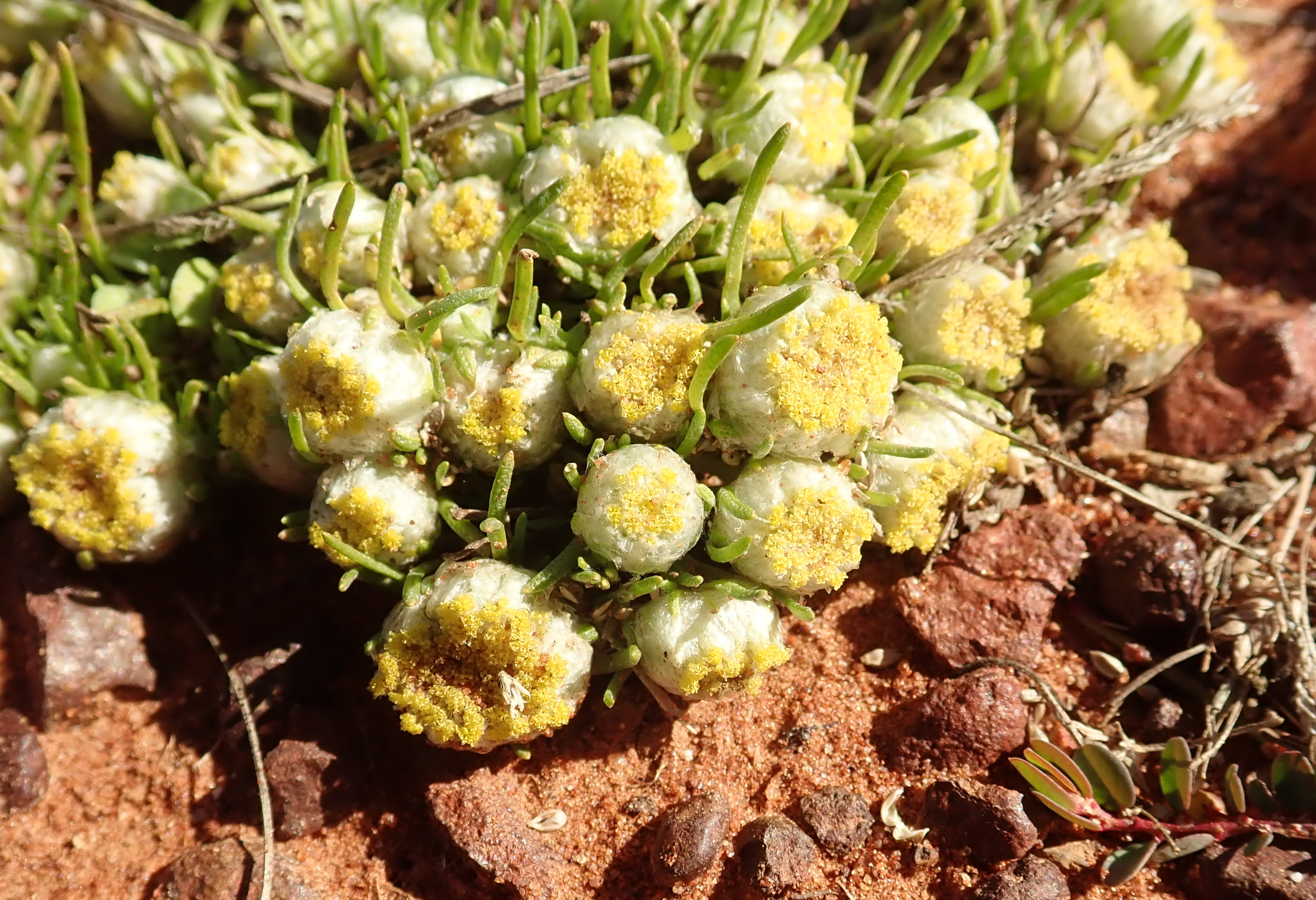
- Myriocephalus pluriflorus

Scientific classification
- Kingdom: Plantae
- Clade: Tracheophytes
- Clade: Angiosperms
- Clade: Eudicots
- Clade: Asterids
- Order: Asterales
- Family: Asteraceae
- Subfamily: Asteroideae
- Tribe: Gnaphalieae
- Genus: Myriocephalus; Benth.

Type species
- Myriocephalus appendiculatus Benth.

Synonyms
- Hyalolepis A.Cunn. ex DC.; Elachopappus F.Muell.; Leptotriche Turcz.

= Myriocephalus =

Genus of flowering plants

Myriocephalus is a genus of Australian flowering plants in the family Asteraceae.

Species

- Myriocephalus
  - Myriocephalus appendiculatus
  - Myriocephalus biflorus
  - Myriocephalus gascoynensis
  - Myriocephalus guerinae
  - Myriocephalus helichrysoides
  - Myriocephalus nudus
  - Myriocephalus occidentalis
  - Myriocephalus oldfieldii
  - Myriocephalus pluriflorus
  - Myriocephalus pygmaea
  - Myriocephalus rhizocephalus
  - Myriocephalus rudallii
  - Myriocephalus scalpellus
  - Myriocephalus squamatus
  - Myriocephalus walcottii
