= Nonning =

Pastoral lease in South Australia

Coordinates: 32.52°S 136.491°E

Location in South Australia

Nonning or Nonning Station is both a pastoral lease and a formal bounded locality in South Australia. The property operates as a sheep station; the name and boundaries of the formal locality were created on 26 April 2013 for the long established local name.

It is situated approximately 69 kilometres (43 mi) north of Kimba and 66 kilometres (41 mi) west of Iron Knob. The property is at the eastern end of the Gawler Range and is bounded to the north by Beacon Hill Station, to the west by Kolendo and Mount Ive, to the south by Uno and to the east by Siam Station.

The traditional owners of the Gawler Ranges are the Gugada people.

A lease in the area was taken up by Charles Ryan in 1864. Nonning was established by C. H. Leycester in 1864. The lease changed hands many times in the 1860s. In 1868 the property occupied an area of 476 square miles (1,233 km^{2}) and was equipped with wells and dams and stocked with over 7,000 sheep. Later, Nonning was combined with Kolendo and Coralbignie in the late 1860s with Nonning as the head station. At one stage some 90,000 head of sheep were shorn at Nonning. The lease expired in 1888.

Rentals increased in the 1890s and many pastoralists deserted their runs. Eventually rentals were decreased again and McTaggart, Smith and Gooch acquired the lease for Nonning in 1906, and by 1915 McTaggart was the sole owner.

Dorper sheep had been introduced to a merino base in 2003. In 2010 the 4,000-square-kilometre (1,544 sq mi) property was awarded organic status. The McTaggart family completed their last shearing in early 2009 and had started running sheep for the production of meat instead of wool. Nonning was supporting about a flock of 30,000 sheep.

Nonning Post Office opened in 1867; its closure date is unknown. A primary school also formerly existed at Nonning.

Nonning hosts the annual Nonning Gymkhana, organised by the Gawler Ranges Progress Association, to raise money for the Royal Flying Doctor Service.

The Coralbignie (Houlderoo) Rocks, located at the southern end of the Nonning locality, are listed on the South Australian Heritage Register as a designated place of geological significance.

== See also ==
- List of ranches and stations
