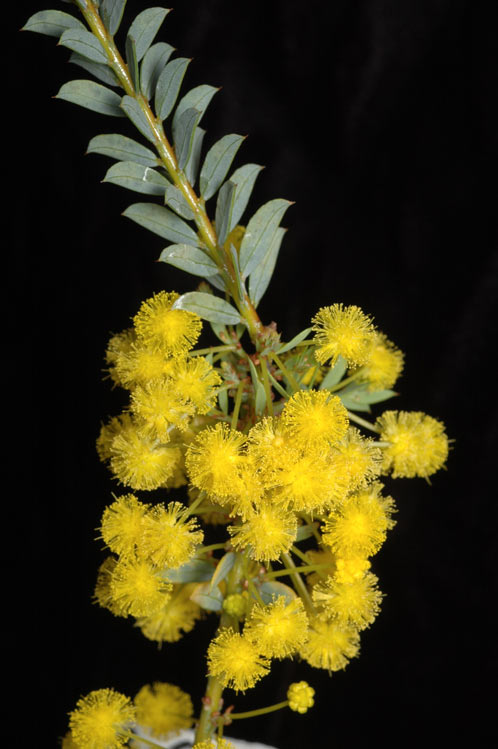

Scientific classification
- Kingdom: Plantae
- Clade: Tracheophytes
- Clade: Angiosperms
- Clade: Eudicots
- Clade: Rosids
- Order: Fabales
- Family: Fabaceae
- Subfamily: Caesalpinioideae
- Clade: Mimosoid clade
- Genus: Acacia
- Species: A. camptoclada

Binomial name
- Acacia camptoclada C.R.P.Andrews

Synonyms
- List: Acacia porphyrochila E.Pritz.; Racosperma camptocladum (C.R.P.Andrews) Pedley

= Acacia camptoclada =

Species of legume

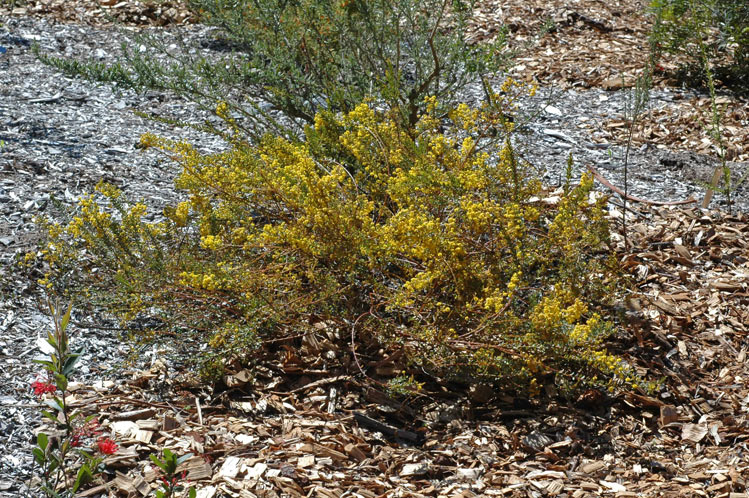
Habit in the Australian National Botanic Gardens

Acacia camptoclada is a species of flowering plant in the family Fabaceae and is endemic to Western Australia. It is a low, spreading to erect, glabrous shrub with crowded, oblong to narrowly oblong phyllodes, spherical heads of golden yellow flowers, and coiled, firmly papery to thinly leathery pods.

== Description ==
Acacia camptoclada is a low, spreading to erect, glabrous shrub that typically grows to a height of 0.2–1 m (7.9 in – 3 ft 3.4 in) and is slightly sticky. Its phyllodes are crowded, ascending to erect, oblong to narrowly oblong, 7–17 mm (0.28–0.67 in) long and 2–5 mm (0.079–0.197 in) wide with a more or less sharply-pointed point on the end. There are stipules at the base of the phyllodes but that fall off. The flowers are borne in two to five spherical heads in racemes 0.5–4 mm (0.020–0.157 in) long on peduncles 4–15 mm (0.16–0.59 in) long. The heads are often crowded in upper axils, and contain 15 to 21 showy, golden yellow flowers. Flowering occurs from August to October, and the pods are coiled once or twice, firmly papery to thinly leathery, 4–5 mm (0.16–0.20 in) wide containing black, egg-shaped to elliptic seeds about 3 mm (0.12 in) long.

== Taxonomy ==
Acacia camptoclada was first formally described in 1904 by Cecil Rollo Payton Andrews in the Journal of the West Australian Natural History Society from specimens he collected near Dundas in 1903. The specific epithet (camptoclada) means 'flexible-, curved- or bent-shoot or branch.

== Distribution and habitat ==
This species of wattle grows in sand or clay in woodland and mallee between Southern Cross to near Balladonia in the Avon Wheatbelt, Coolgardie, Great Victoria Desert, Mallee and Murchison bioregions of Western Australia.

== Conservation status ==
Acacia camptoclada is listed as "not threatened" by the Government of Western Australia Department of Biodiversity, Conservation and Attractions.

== See also ==
- List of Acacia species
