= District Council of Kimba =

Coordinates: 33°08′00″S 136°25′00″E

- Local government area
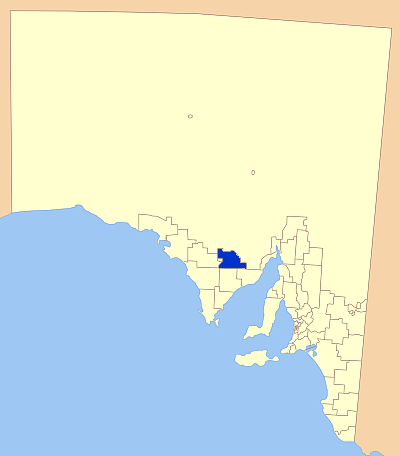
- Location of the District Council of Kimba

- Interactive map of District Council of Kimba
- Country: Australia
- State: South Australia
- Region: Eyre and Western
- Established: 1924
- Council seat: Kimba

Government
  - Mayor: Dean Johnson
  - State electorate: Flinders
  - Federal division: Grey

Area
  - Total: 3,986.2 km^{2} (1,539.1 sq mi)

Population
  - Total: 1,037 (LGA 2021)
- Website: District Council of Kimba
LGAs around District Council of Kimba
Outback Communities Authority	Outback Communities Authority	Outback Communities Authority
Wudinna District Council	District Council of Kimba	Outback Communities Authority
District Council of Elliston	District Council of Cleve	District Council of Franklin Harbour

The District Council of Kimba is a local government area located on the northern Eyre Peninsula in South Australia. The district is mostly agricultural in nature, with the township of Kimba being the focal point of the district. With a number of towns positioned close to the Gawler Ranges, the district receives a modest amount of attention from tourists, who also stop by to see Kimba's Big Galah.

== History ==
Pastoralists began colonising the area that would become the district in the early 1900s without many essential facilities such as road and water supplies. In 1913 the Port Lincoln Railway was extended to a new siding named 'Kimba', and two years later, the town of Kimba was officially proclaimed.

With new settlers to the area, the need for basic facilities was growing, the Kimba Vigilance Committee was established to lobby for the provision of these facilities. In 1925, the District Council of Kimba was established.

Since 1925, the district has grown in size, with a number of areas being added during 1936–1937, and again in 1967.

== Localities ==
The district's focal point is the town and council seat of Kimba; it also includes the localities of Barna, Cootra, Cortlinye, Cunyarie, Kelly, Moseley, Panitya, Solomon, Wilcherry and Yalanda, and part of Buckleboo, Caralue, Lake Gilles, Koongawa, Pinkawillinie and Waddikee.

== Facilities ==
The district has most essential facilities available including service stations, automotive repairers, laundromat, learning and business centre, accommodation, supermarkets, speciality shops, and many eating facilities.

Other community services include a medical centre, a hospital, a library and school

== Council ==
Ward	Councillor	Notes
Unsubdivided	Phil Arcus	
Unsubdivided	Graeme Baldock	Deputy Mayor
Unsubdivided	Brian Cant	
Unsubdivided	Geoff Churchett	
Unsubdivided	Dean Johnson	Mayor
Unsubdivided	Megan Lienert	
Unsubdivided	Peter Rayson	

== Mayors and chairmen of Kimba ==
- Frank Roy Ferry (1930–1948)
- Alfred Charles Frick (1948-1950)
- Clifford Hamlet Richard Martin (1950-1957)
- Arthur Erwin Schaefer (1957-1965)
- Kenneth Charles Yates (1965-1967)
- Glen Gordon Cant (1967–1976)
- Hiram Kenneth Mayfield (1976–1980)
- Leo John Schaefer (1980–1984)

== See also ==
- Kimba Airport
