= Pinkawillinie Conservation Park =

Conservation park in South Australia

- IUCN category VI (protected area with sustainable use of natural resources)
- Location within South Australia
- Location: South Australia
- Nearest city: Kimba
- Coordinates: 33.0°S 135.8°E
- Area: 1,301.51 km^{2} (502.52 sq mi)
- Established: 1970
- Governing body: Department for Environment and Water

The Pinkawillinie Conservation Park is 60 kilometres (37 mi) west of Kimba on the inland side of Eyre Peninsula in South Australia.

The park encompasses 130 000 hectares and abuts the Gawler Ranges National Park to the north west. There is limited two-wheel drive access to the park and no facilities.

The conservation park is categorised as an IUCN Category VI protected area. In 1980, it was listed on the now-defunct Register of the National Estate.

== See also ==
- Protected areas of South Australia
- Corrobinnie Hill Conservation Park
