= Lake Gilles Conservation Park =

Protected area in South Australia

- IUCN category Ia (strict nature reserve)
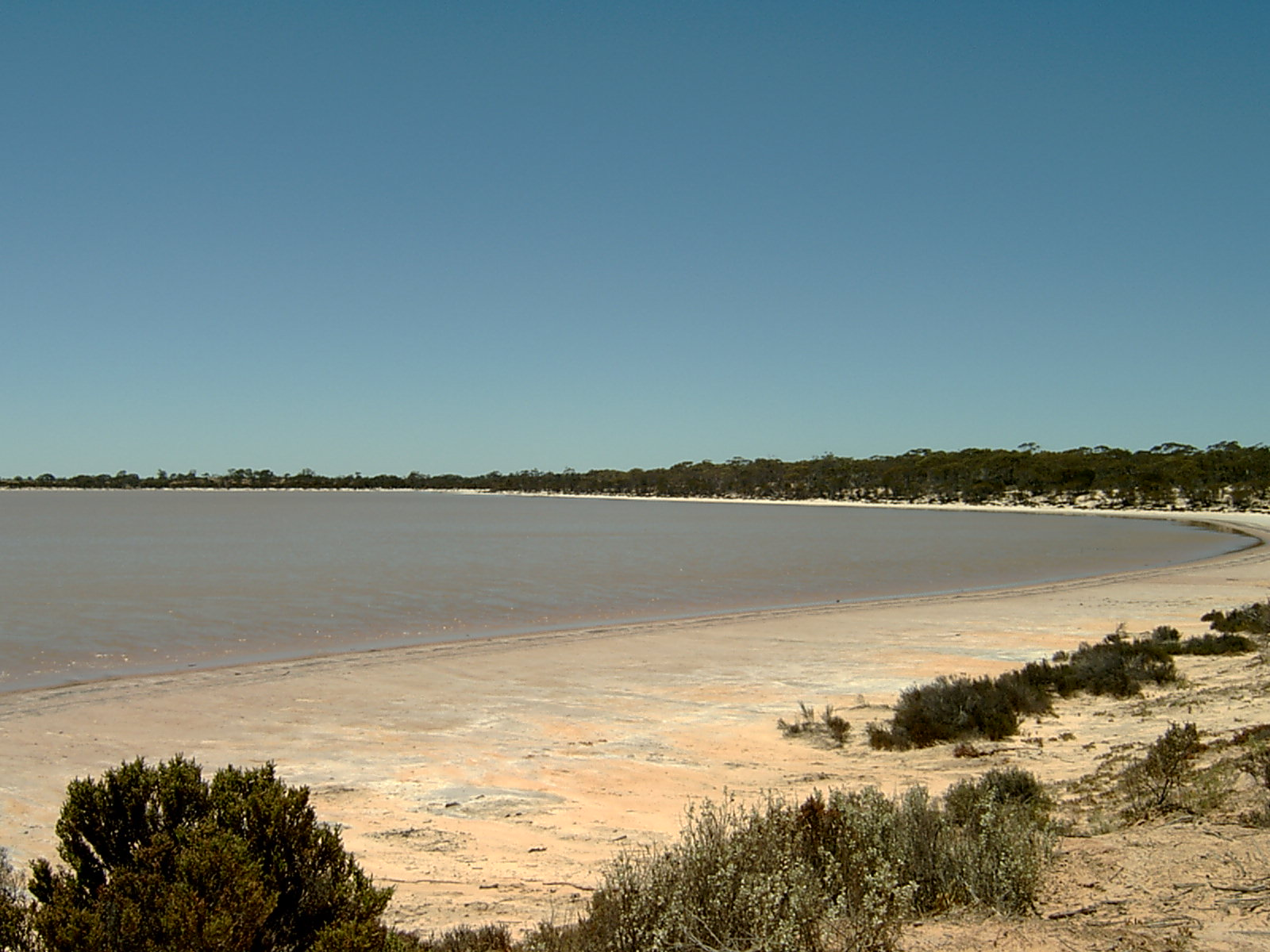
- The southern shore of Lake Gilles looking northeast

- Location within South Australia
- Location: South Australia, Lake Gilles
- Nearest city: Kimba
- Coordinates: 32°58′23.16″S 136°44′35.15″E
- Area: 655.27 km^{2} (253.00 sq mi)
- Established: 30 September 1971
- Governing body: Department for Environment and Water
- Website: Official website

Lake Gilles Conservation Park (formerly Lake Gilles National Park) is a protected area in the Australian state of South Australia located in the north of the Eyre Peninsula about 20 kilometres (12 mi) east of Kimba in the gazetted locality of Lake Gilles.

The conservation park was originally proclaimed as the Lake Gilles National Park under the former National Parks Act 1966 on 30 September 1971. It was subsequently renamed as the Lake Gilles Conservation Park upon the proclamation of the National Parks and Wildlife Act 1972 on 27 April 1972. On 5 August 2010, the Lake Gilles Conservation Reserve which have been dedicated as a conservation reserve on 9 December 1994 under the state's Crown Lands Act 1929 was added to the conservation park along with another parcel of crown land. As of 2014, access permitted under the state's Mining Act 1971 and Petroleum and Geothermal Energy Act 2000 only applies to the extent of the Lake Gilles water body.

In 2014, the conservation park was described by its managing authority as follows:

...an ephemeral lake system fringed by samphire communities. The park [sic] provides habitat for the Malleefowl, Slender-billed thornbill, Thick-billed grasswren and migratory waders. Extensive but patchy mallee communities on the eastern plains of the park [sic] include Western Myall and associated chenopod shrubland.

The conservation park is classified as an IUCN Category Ia protected area. In 1980, it was listed on the now-defunct Register of the National Estate.

== Vandalism ==
In 2012 and 2013, off-trail driving, burning and cutting of native vegetation, and the abandonment of rubbish and furniture were reported to have occurred in the conservation park.

== See also ==
- Protected areas of South Australia
