= Kimba, South Australia =

Kimba
- Town
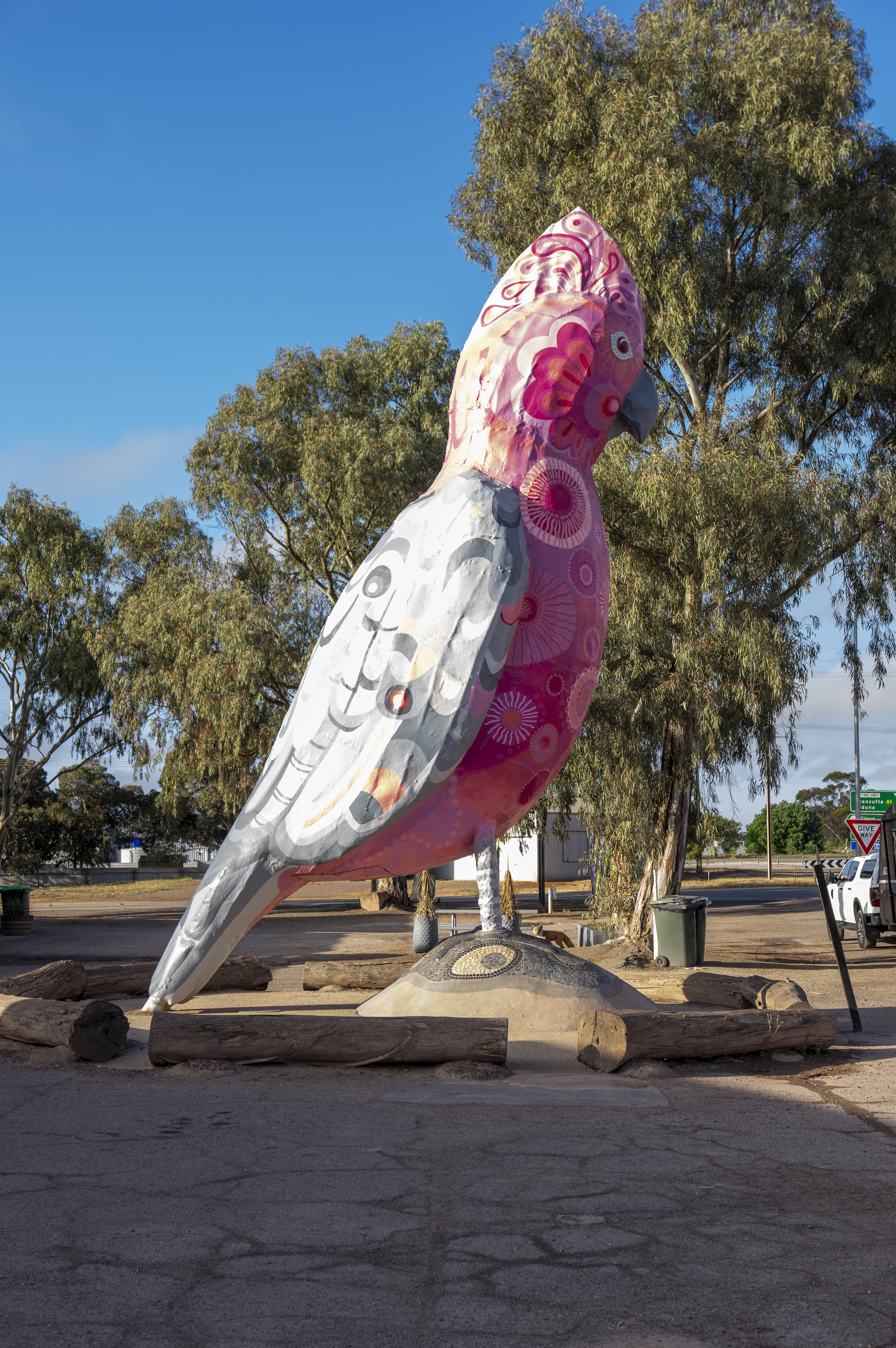
- Big Galah

- Interactive map of Kimba
- Coordinates: 33°08′22″S 136°25′09″E
- Country: Australia
- State: South Australia
- Region: Eyre Western
- LGA: District Council of Kimba
- Location: 282 km (175 mi) north-west of Adelaide
- Established: 29 April 1915 (town); 6 May 1999 (locality)

Government
  - State electorate: Giles
  - Federal division: Grey
- Elevation weather station: 280 m (920 ft)

Population
  - Total: 608 (SAL 2021)
- Time zone: UTC+9:30 (ACST)
  - Summer (DST): UTC+10:30 (ACST)
- Postcode: 5641
- County: Buxton
- Mean max temp: 23.6 °C (74.5 °F)
- Mean min temp: 11.4 °C (52.5 °F)
- Annual rainfall: 348.1 mm (13.70 in)
Localities around Kimba
Cortlinye	Cortlinye; Moseley	Moseley
Solomon	Kimba	Kelly
Solomon	Solomon; Kelly	Kelly

Kimba is a rural service town on the Eyre Highway at the top of Eyre Peninsula in the Australian state of South Australia. There is an 8-metre (26 ft) tall statue of a galah beside the highway, marking halfway between the east and west coasts of Australia. The Gawler Ranges are north of the highway near the town.

Kimba is located in the federal division of Grey, the state electoral district of Giles and the local government area of the District Council of Kimba.

The word "kimba" is derived from the local Aboriginal word for "bushfire", and the District Council of Kimba's emblem reflects this in the form of a burning bush. The town was built on Barngarla lands.

== Early history ==
The first European in the area was explorer Edward John Eyre, who passed through the area on his passage from Streaky Bay to the head of Spencer Gulf in late 1839.

The area was first settled in the 1870s by lease-holding pastoralists who moved north up the Eyre Peninsula during the 1870s and 1880s. They lightly stocked the land and relied on the limited water supplies and intermittent open grass lands to raise their stock. It was more intensively settled for wheat farming from 1908, when overseas demand for wheat increased in the late nineteenth and early twentieth centuries. The large tracts of mallee scrub began to be cleared to facilitate this, and soon regular mail services were established from the port at Cowell. Bags of wheat had to be loaded onto bullock drays which carried the produce to Cowell 76 km south.

In 1913, Kimba was connected by narrow gauge railway to Port Lincoln. This development encouraged a number of new wheat farmers to move into the area. Two years later the township of Kimba was officially proclaimed and service industries began to move into the district.

Education within the town is provided by the Kimba Area School where around 170 students from reception to year 12 attend.

== National Radioactive Waste Management Facility ==
Two properties in the Kimba district were nominated in 2017 for a proposed National Radioactive Waste Management Facility, to store low-level and intermediate-level nuclear waste. One is owned by Brett and Michelle Rayner, and the other is owned by Andrew and Dale Baldock. A third proposed site was located at Barndioota in the Flinders Ranges.

In 2017, a Kimba town vote demonstrated support for further investigation of the prospect. The result of the vote was 396 to 294 in favour. Opposition to the project has been expressed by community groups No Radioactive Waste on Agricultural Land in Kimba or SA and the Against Radioactive Waste Action Group.

On 1 February 2020 federal resources minister, Matt Canavan, announced that 160 hectares (400 acres) of Jeff Baldock's Napandee property, 20 kilometres (12 mi) west of Kimba, would provide the location to permanently store low-level waste. The facility would also temporarily store intermediate-level waste from Lucas Heights nuclear reactor, until a suitable permanent site was found.

The federal government is allocating a A$31 million community development package to boost the skills of local businesses and workers to build and run the facility. The facility would cost A$200 million, and create 45 jobs during construction and 25 ongoing jobs. In 2023 the project was cancelled after Barngarla traditional owners won a case against its construction in the Federal Court.

== Culture ==
Kimba is situated on the traditional lands of the Barngarla people.

An 8-metre (26 ft) large-scale public artwork known as "The Big Galah" welcomes visitors to Kimba as they enter the township. The Kimba Art Prize is held annually by the District Council of Kimba. Selected works are displayed in the Kimba Institute in September, and an award is presented to a local artist. In 2017, the art prize received 150 entries from around South Australia and interstate.

In 2017 a 30-metre (98 ft) high mural was completed on the town's grain silos by Melbourne artist Cam Scale, part of the silo art projects that extend across South Australia and Victoria.

== Climate ==
Kimba has a mediterranean-influenced semi-arid climate (Köppen BSk/Csa), with very warm, dry summers and mild, somewhat wetter winters. Temperatures vary throughout the year, with average maxima between 31.6 °C (88.9 °F) in January and 15.5 °C (59.9 °F) in July, and average minima between 16.0 °C (60.8 °F) in February and 5.0 °C (41.0 °F) in July. Annual precipitation is low, averaging 345.7 mm (13.61 in), between 85.6 precipitation days- primarily concentrated in winter. The town has 99.4 clear days and 111.6 cloudy days annually. Extreme temperatures have ranged from 47.0 °C (116.6 °F) on 24 January 2019 to −1.7 °C (28.9 °F) on 15 July 1968.

Kimba is located north of Goyder's Line, where precipitation is less than the total potential evapotranspiration. Winter rainfall is essential for cereal (predominantly wheat and barley with some oats and canola) agriculture. Grazing is also practised, largely that of merino sheep for wool production with smaller amounts of cattle grazing. Water for stock is sourced solely from rainfall due to the paucity of reliable groundwater in the district.

Climate data for Kimba, South Australia (33º08'24"S, 136º24'36"E, 280 metres or 919 feet AMSL) (1967–2024 normals and extremes, rainfall 1920–2024)
Month	Jan	Feb	Mar	Apr	May	Jun	Jul	Aug	Sep	Oct	Nov	Dec	Year
Record high °C (°F)	47.0 (116.6)	44.8 (112.6)	42.3 (108.1)	37.8 (100.0)	30.0 (86.0)	25.8 (78.4)	27.0 (80.6)	30.0 (86.0)	35.5 (95.9)	39.0 (102.2)	43.5 (110.3)	46.0 (114.8)	47.0 (116.6)
Mean daily maximum °C (°F)	31.6 (88.9)	31.1 (88.0)	28.0 (82.4)	23.9 (75.0)	19.4 (66.9)	16.0 (60.8)	15.5 (59.9)	17.0 (62.6)	20.4 (68.7)	24.0 (75.2)	27.1 (80.8)	29.4 (84.9)	23.6 (74.5)
Mean daily minimum °C (°F)	15.8 (60.4)	16.0 (60.8)	14.1 (57.4)	11.3 (52.3)	8.4 (47.1)	6.0 (42.8)	5.0 (41.0)	5.5 (41.9)	7.1 (44.8)	9.2 (48.6)	11.9 (53.4)	14.0 (57.2)	10.4 (50.6)
Record low °C (°F)	5.3 (41.5)	7.7 (45.9)	4.3 (39.7)	0.6 (33.1)	0.8 (33.4)	−0.8 (30.6)	−1.7 (28.9)	−0.8 (30.6)	−1.1 (30.0)	0.4 (32.7)	2.5 (36.5)	4.6 (40.3)	−1.7 (28.9)
Average rainfall mm (inches)	19.2 (0.76)	20.5 (0.81)	16.6 (0.65)	22.5 (0.89)	34.7 (1.37)	40.3 (1.59)	40.6 (1.60)	41.5 (1.63)	36.2 (1.43)	30.1 (1.19)	23.4 (0.92)	20.4 (0.80)	345.7 (13.61)
Average rainy days (≥ 0.2 mm)	3.0	3.1	3.4	5.4	9.3	10.8	12.4	12.4	9.0	7.3	5.3	4.2	85.6
Average afternoon relative humidity (%)	28	31	33	38	49	57	55	50	42	34	30	30	40
Average dew point °C (°F)	7.6 (45.7)	9.1 (48.4)	7.9 (46.2)	6.9 (44.4)	6.9 (44.4)	6.1 (43.0)	5.2 (41.4)	4.4 (39.9)	4.5 (40.1)	4.3 (39.7)	5.1 (41.2)	6.9 (44.4)	6.2 (43.2)
Source: Bureau of Meteorology (1967–2024 normals and extremes, rainfall 1920–2024)

== Soils and geomorphology ==
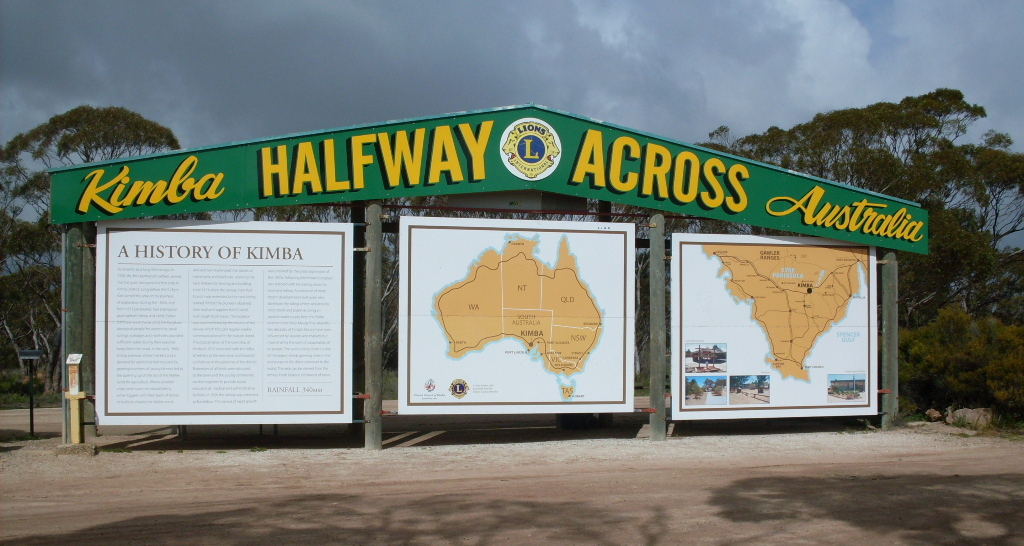
"Halfway Across Australia" sign at Kimba

The Kimba district is dominated by calcareous earths, containing distinctive calcrete profiles and varying degrees of development, with minor ferruginous red-brown earths and local pisolitic regions. The major exception is to the south west of the Kimba District, within the Corrobinnie Depression, a palaeochannel which is now filled with deep sands. Much of this region is unsuitable for agriculture and comprises the Pinkawillinie Conservation Park. Locally grey loams and gypsum bearing flats are developed, with minor evaporites surrounding playa lakes, such as Lake Gilles at the eastern end of the district.

Small rounded hills in the form of Wild Dog Hill occur in the Kelly region to the east of Kimba township, with two ranges, Botanella Hills and the Wilcherry Range comprising uplands to the north east. The Gawler Ranges located in the pastoral country to the far north, the Cleve Uplands to the south, and the Corrobinnie Depression comprise distinct geomorphic boundaries to the District Council of Kimba.

== Notable persons from Kimba ==
=== Parliamentarians ===
- Arthur Whyte; Member and Leader of the South Australian Legislative Council (1966–1985; Leader from 1978 to 1985)
- Barry Wakelin; Federal member for Grey (1993–2007)
- Caroline Schaefer; Member of the South Australian Legislative Council (1993–2010)
- Rowan Ramsey; Federal member for Grey (2007–present)

=== AFL footballers ===
- Robert Schaefer, Richmond, (1993; 11 games)
- Shane Wakelin, St Kilda (1994–2000; 94 games), Collingwood (2001–2008; 158 games), 252 total
- Darryl Wakelin, St Kilda (1995–2000; 115 games), Port Adelaide (2001–2007; 146 games), 261 total
- Corey Enright, Geelong (2001–2016; 332 games), 6x All Australian (2008–2011, 2013,2016), 3x Premiership player (2007, 2009, 2011).

== See also ==
- Kimba (disambiguation)
