= Leioproctus wanni =

Scientific classification
- Kingdom: Animalia
- Phylum: Arthropoda
- Clade: Pancrustacea
- Class: Insecta
- Order: Hymenoptera
- Family: Colletidae
- Genus: Leioproctus
- Species: L. wanni

Binomial name
- Leioproctus wanni Leijs & Hogendoorn, 2016

Species of bee

Leioproctus wanni, or Leioproctus (Goniocolletes) wanni, is a species of bee in the family Colletidae and subfamily Colletinae. It is endemic to Australia. It was described by entomologists Remko Leijs and Katja Hogendoorn in 2016.

== Etymology ==
The specific epithet wanni honours Stan Wann.

== Description ==
The male holotype body length is 12 mm, head width 3.3 mm; the female paratype body length is 13 mm, head width 3.8 mm. Integumental colouration is mainly black, orange and brown. The hair is white and orange.

== Distribution and habitat ==
The species occurs in inland southern Australia. Type localities include Hiltaba Station in the Gawler Ranges of South Australia, and a site south of Salmon Gums, Western Australia.

== Behaviour ==
The adults are flying mellivores. Flowering plants visited by the bees include Eucalyptus, Melaleuca and Myoporum species.
