= Acacia clelandii =

Umbrella mulga

Scientific classification
- Kingdom: Plantae
- Clade: Tracheophytes
- Clade: Angiosperms
- Clade: Eudicots
- Clade: Rosids
- Order: Fabales
- Family: Fabaceae
- Subfamily: Caesalpinioideae
- Clade: Mimosoid clade
- Genus: Acacia
- Species: A. clelandii

Binomial name
- Acacia clelandii Pedley
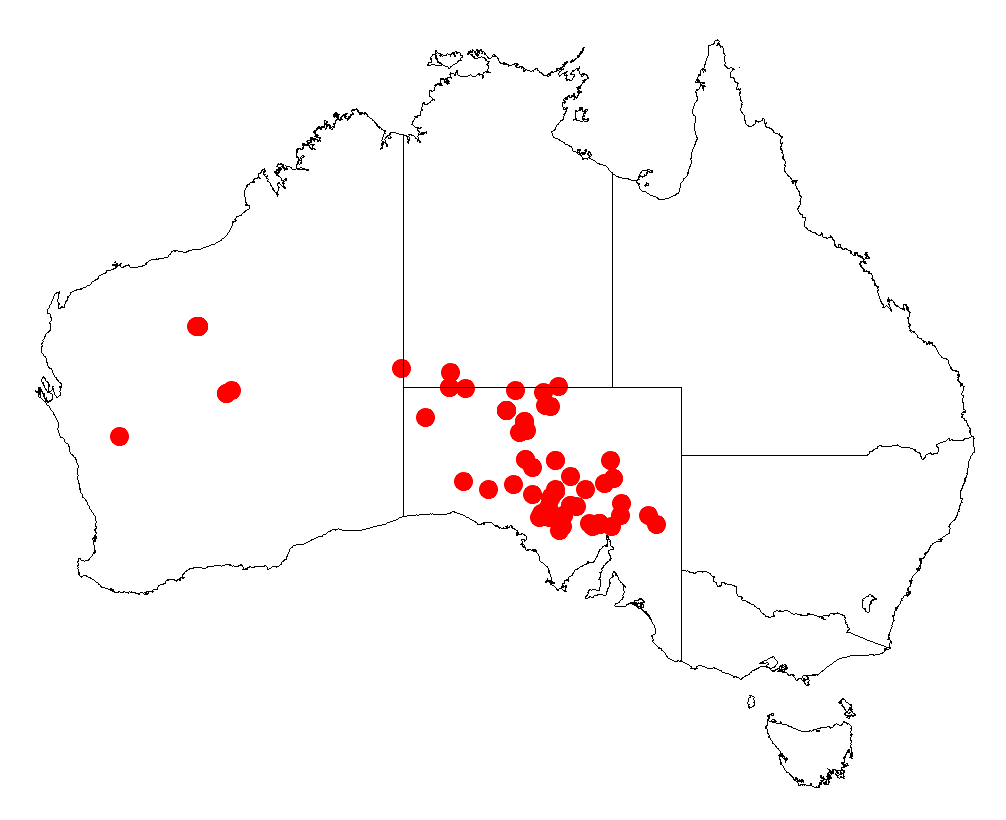
- Occurrence data from AVH

Synonyms
- Acacia clelandii Pedley nom. inval.; Racosperma clelandii (Pedley) Pedley; Acacia brachystachya auct. non Benth.: Randell, B.R. p.p.; Acacia cibaria auct. non F.Muell.

Species of legume

Acacia clelandii, also known as umbrella mulga, is a species of flowering plant in the family Fabaceae and is endemic to south-western continental Australia. It is a spreading shrub with hairy branchlets, more or less terete, straight or slightly curved phyllodes, spikes of yellow flowers, and oblong, tough, flexible pods.

== Description ==
Acacia clelandii is a spreading shrub that typically grows to a height of up to 5 m (16 ft). Its branchlets are covered in white hairs pressed against the surface between yellowish ribs, the new growth with scattered red glandular hairs. It phyllodes are more or less terete, straight or slightly curved, mostly 50–125 mm (2.0–4.9 in)| long and 1.0–1.5 mm (0.039–0.059 in) wide with hairs pressed against the surface between longitudinal veins. The flowers are borne in spikes 10–25 mm (0.39–0.98 in) long in axils, on a peduncle 4–10 mm (0.16–0.39 in) long. Flowering has been recorded from May to July and in September and October, and the pods are stalkless, oblong, flat, straight, 25–50 mm (0.98–1.97 in) long and 6–10 mm (0.24–0.39 in) wide, brown, tough, but flexible. The seeds are oblong, 4–6 mm (0.16–0.24 in) long with a small aril.

== Taxonomy ==
Acacia clelandii was first formally described by Leslie Pedley in the Flora of Australia from specimens collected on the Eyre Peninsula in 1972. The specific epithet (clelandii) honours the biologist Sir John Burton Cleland.

== Distribution and habitat ==
Umbrella mulga is mainly found on dunes or rocky hills in South Australia, especially in the Gawler Range and the far north of the state, where the range extends into adjoining parts of Western Australia. It has a limited and scattered distribution in the Pilbara, Gascoyne and Murchison bioregions of Western Australia.

== See also ==
- List of Acacia species
