= Barbara Hardy =

Barbara Hardy may refer to:

- Barbara Hardy (literary scholar), British literary scholar, author, and poet
- Barbara Hardy (environmentalist), Australian environmentalist and scientist
