= Nature Foundation =

Australian nature conservation organisation

- Formation: 1981; 45 years ago
- Type: NGO
- Legal status: charity
- Purpose: nature conservation
- Headquarters: Prospect, South Australia
- Members: 503 (2024)
- Board Chair: Jan Ferguson OAM
- CEO: Alex Nankivell
- Revenue: $6.3 million (FY2023/24)
- Expenses: $5.9 million (FY2023/24)
- Website: https://www.naturefoundation.org.au/
- Formerly called: The National Parks Foundation

Nature Foundation, formerly The National Parks Foundation and Nature Foundation SA Inc. (NFSA), is the largest non-government nature conservation organisation based in South Australia. It was founded in October 1981, and is supported by the Government of South Australia as well as the Australian Government. The organisation owns and manages several nature reserves, with the largest being Witchelina and Hiltaba, which are converted stations.

== History ==
The Nature Foundation was founded as The National Parks Foundation on 14 October 1981 by a group comprising Warren Bonython, Barbara Hardy, Mark Bonnin (a medical doctor and lecturer at the University of Adelaide) and David Cleland. It grew and extended its functions, becoming Nature Foundation about 10 years later. It was formerly known as Nature Foundation SA Inc. (also referred to as NFSA).

It was formerly headquartered in Hindmarsh.

By the time of its 30th anniversary in 2011, it had helped to enable the acquisition of over 25 properties covering over 7,000 km^{2} (2,700 sq mi) for conservation purposes, and provided grants to more than 300 university researchers. Around this time, it created the "Water for Nature" which involved the purchase of water along the River Murray in order to use it in conserving small, private wetland areas along the river.

In 2011 and 2012 the foundation held two fund-raising bush walks. In 2012, there was a choice of three walks: easy (3 km (1.9 mi)), intermediate (6 km (3.7 mi) and hard (12 km (7.5 mi), all along part of the Heysen Trail. It was anticipated that around A$30,000 would be raised by around 500 participants.

CEO Hugo Hopton retired on 22 April 2022, after six years of service.

== Description ==
Nature Foundation is the largest non-government conservation organisation based in South Australia, and undertakes programs in conserving land, wetland and species. Its stated mission is "engaging people, resources and good science to conserve the precious habitat of South Australia".

Its Bush Bank SA enabled the foundation to purchase and rejuvenate properties which it has then sold to new owners who are obliged to maintain them under conservation status.

Its work includes managing nature reserves; undertaking a wide-ranging science strategy, including arranging funding for ecological research; conservation programs, such as Water for Nature and the Bushbank Revolving Fund; the Kids on Country program; and various other initiatives. It is a member of Friends of Parks South Australia.

It also delivers the Revitalising Private Conservation in South Australia program, which coordinates and delivers funding for conservation programs by the Government of South Australia. In August 2021, the Marshall government announced $1 million in grant funding for native vegetation conservation projects under this grant program, to be delivered by Nature Foundation in partnership with Conservation SA, Livestock SA, Nature Conservation Society of South Australia and Trees for Life.

== Governance and funding ==
Nature Foundation is a limited company under the Corporations Act 2001, managed by an unpaid Board of Directors. It is governed by a board of conservationists, scientists, business and professional people, and is managed by a small team based in Prospect, a suburb north of Adelaide, along with rotational managers at its nature reserves. It also relies on support by members, donors and volunteers who work at fund-raising, office administration and working bees.

In addition, there are a number of committees, and rotational managers who spend time managing the various properties.

Since before 2011 and as of 2015, Bob Lott was president of the foundation.

The CEO was Hugo Hopton for six years until his retirement on 22 April 2022. Alex Nankivell, who has been with the foundation since 2008 and is also Science and Knowledge Program Manager, took over as interim CEO, with Mark Ashley as deputy.

As of April 2022 Jan Ferguson is chair of the board. There are three patrons: founder Barbara Hardy, entrepreneur Dick Smith, and geophysicist Reg Nelson.

Apart from government grants, the foundation receives donations from local philanthropists and a portion of the "significant environmental benefits" payments which mining companies have to pay in South Australia, and undertakes fund-raising drives.

== Nature reserves ==
As of 2022 Nature Foundation's nature reserves comprise nearly 40 per cent of all private protected areas in South Australia, and 6 per cent nationally. It implements various conservation projects that bring biodiversity benefits to these areas. It owns and manages eight nature reserves:

- Witchelina Nature Reserve, near Leigh Creek in the north of the state
- Hiltaba Nature Reserve, Gawler Ranges
- Watchalunga Nature Reserve, Fleurieu Peninsula
- Para Woodlands Nature Reserve, near Gawler
- Tiliqua Nature Reserve, near Burra
- Murbpook Nature Reserve, a wetland reserve on the Murray River
- Geegeela Nature Reserve, abutting Geegeela Conservation Park in Bangham, South Australia in the south-east of the state
- Cygnet Park Sanctuary, Kangaroo Island

Watchalunga was established in March 2015, and comprises around 20 per cent of the swamplands on the Finniss River, near Finniss. The wetland provides habitat for the Mount Lofty Ranges Southern Emu-wren, an endangered species, and the southern bell frog, which is a threatened species. Nature Foundation works in collaboration with the Ngarrindjeri Regional Authority, the Goolwa to Wellington local action planning group, and Conservation SA in managing the land and undertaking research at Watchlunga.

== Kids on Country ==
The "Kids on Country" program, for Aboriginal adolescents, is aimed at improving well-being, teaching life skills, building self-confidence, strengthening cultural identity and connection to country, and inspiring an interest in conservation and land management in this group, thus improving school retention rate. Programs are tailored to the secondary school curriculum, and include a high degree of STEM-related topics.

The program, which is run in collaboration with Aboriginal community leaders, secondary schools, and industry partners comprises:

- A program induction workshop at participating schools
- Access to a specially-created e-learning program
- A 5-day camp program, run in collaboration with traditional owners and industry experts

Camps are run at both Hiltaba and Witchelina. In the third camp of the programme at Hiltaba in 2018, 16 students aged from 12 to 14 years old from Ceduna spent a week on the property, where they helped to improve the property as a nature reserve, while at the same time learning about Aboriginal peoples' unique connection to country, along with STEM learning. The aim was to help the children to connect the Aboriginal, palaeontological, and geological stories of the area. The students helped to prepare bush tucker such as kangaroo tail and wombat meat, and to clean the rock holes. Another camp was held at Hiltaba in 2019.
