= Wedgesnout ctenotus =

There are two species of skink named wedgesnout ctenotus:

- Ctenotus brooksi, found in Western Australia, Northern Territory, and South Australia
- Ctenotus euclae, found in South Australia and Western Australia
