= Rough grevillea =

Rough grevillea is a common name for several species of plants native to Australia and may refer to:

- Grevillea aspera
- Grevillea muricata
