= Yardea =

Pastoral lease in South Australia

Coordinates: 32.38°S 135.524°E

Location in South Australia

Yardea Station is a pastoral lease in the Australian state of South Australia that operates as a sheep station, now within the Gawler Ranges National Park. Paney Station became part of Yardea Station in 1904.

It is situated approximately 64 kilometres (40 mi) north east of Minnipa and 157 kilometres (98 mi) west of Iron Knob in the Gawler Ranges.

== History ==
The land occupied by the station is on the traditional lands of the Kokatha, Wirangu and Barngarla peoples. There was once an Aboriginal camp, including a freshwater spring later used as the station's water source, and they maintained and used rock holes in the granite rock formations as a water source.

Yardea was established at some time prior to 1865, and was the first property taken up in the Gawler Ranges, with Hiltaba and Paney following soon afterwards. At one time an estimated 80–90,000 sheep were shorn there. The homestead complex of buildings dates back to the 1860s.

In 1865, the station overseer, John Edmondson, was lost in the bush.

A meteorite fell on the property in 1972.

A police camp was established at Yardea in 1871–2 after being transferred from the nearby Paney Station homestead, with a stone building constructed in 1873 to house the two police troopers. The police were withdrawn from the property in 1885, and the building was converted into a post office and telegraph station. After the direct telegraph link to Western Australia was established in 1903, it became a repeater station.

By 1881 the property was owned by Main, Sells and Company, in which year it is recorded they sold 750 head of cattle and 7,000 wethers to A. Wooldridge of Arcoona Station. In 1882 Main and Sells placed Yardea up for auction along with Wilgena Station. At that time, Yardea occupied an area of 1,063 square miles (2,753 km^{2}) and was stocked with 54,000 sheep.

In the early 1890s, the pastoral lease over Yardea expired. The run was deserted from that time. By 1901 the lease was still abandoned like many others in the area, but did have a caretaker. At this time the property was said to encompass an area of only 300 square miles (777 km^{2}).

The Station remained unlet until it was re-established by Andrew Tennant and James Moseley in 1904. James Moseley also acquired Paney Station, and made Paney Station part of Yardea Station.

In 1916, the property, now consisting of 1,487 square miles (3,851 km^{2}), was sold to A.J. and P.A McBride after much improving of the property, for a sum of £72,000. At this time it was stocked with 40,000 sheep. In 1926, the McBrides cut the property into five blocks and sold three blocks by auction to Harry Bouily, and the other two to T. H. MacKay & Son of Thurlga Station.

== 21st century ==
The site of the old Yardea police station and telegraph station is a few hundred metres to the east of the homestead. Yardea water, between the homestead buildings and the telegraph station, was an Aboriginal freshwater spring until the 1860s, now the main source of station water.

In 2000, the State Government purchased the part of Yardea that had been Paney Station and converted it to Gawler Ranges National Park.

=== Locality ===
The land occupying the extent of the Yardea pastoral lease was gazetted as a locality on 26 April 2013 under the name "Yardea".

=== Solar eclipses ===
Yardea will see four total solar eclipses in the 21st century, on 4 December 2002, 25 November 2030, 26 December 2038, and 31 May 2068.

== See also ==
- List of ranches and stations
