= Myrtle Springs Station =

Pastoral lease in South Australia

Coordinates: 30.4493°S 138.2226°E

Location in South Australia

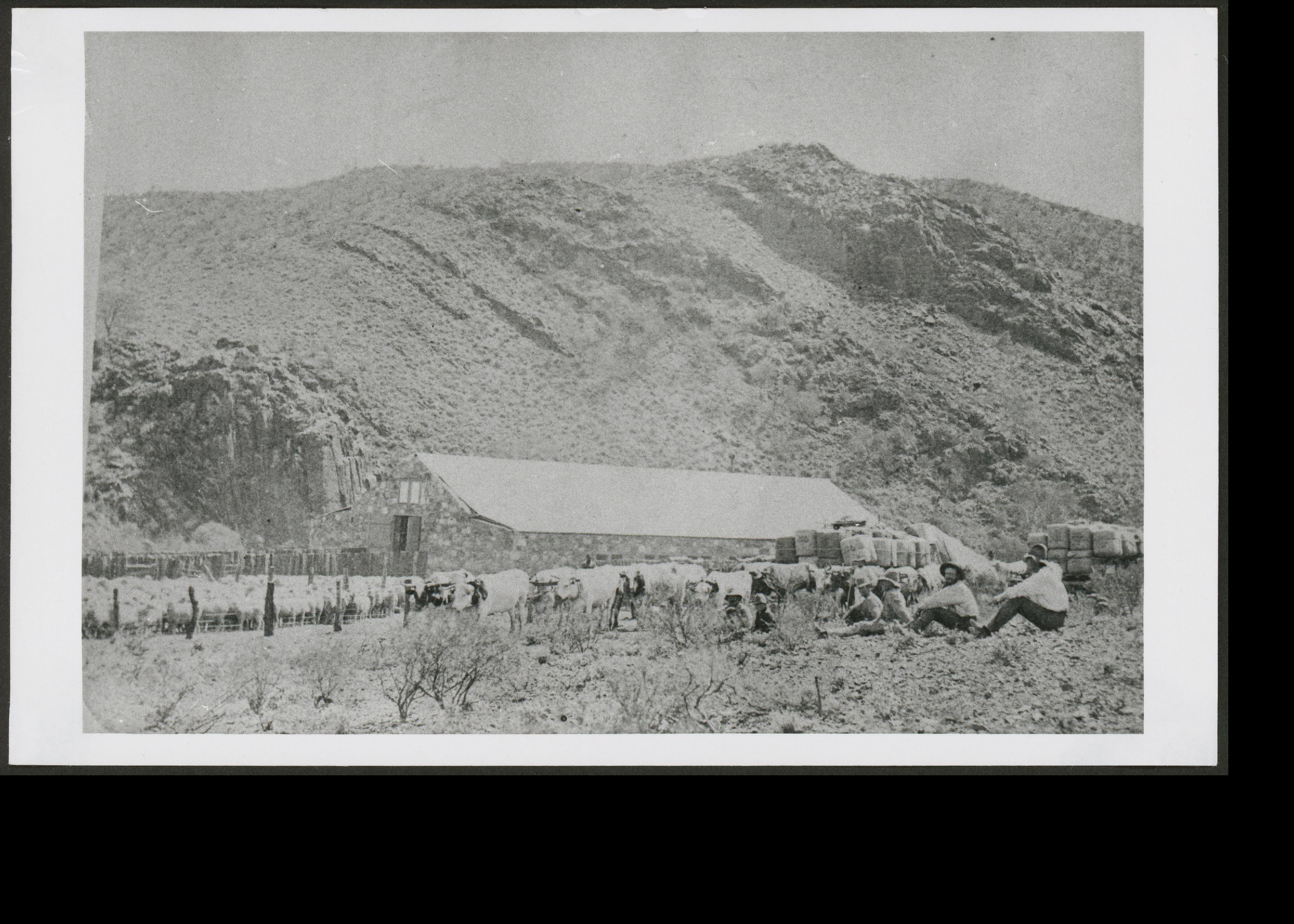
Bullock wagon carting bales of wool from the Woolshed at Myrtle Spring c. 1890

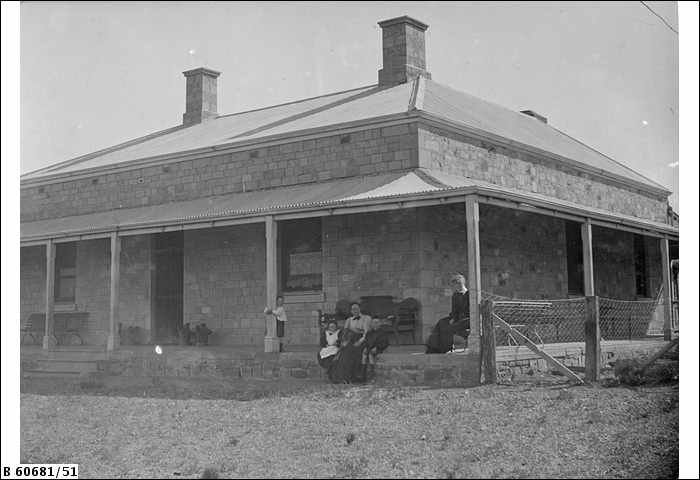
The homestead at Myrtle Springs, with family members sitting on the verandah c. 1898

Myrtle Springs Station is a pastoral lease that operates as a sheep station in outback South Australia.

== Description ==
The station is located approximately 60 kilometres (37 mi) south of Marree and 60 kilometres (37 mi) north of Blinman. The property adjoins Beltana and Leigh Creek Stations. It is on the western side of the northern Flinders Ranges where the ranges stop and the flat plains of the Lake Torrens basin starts. The area is mostly sand dunes interspersed with claypans.

== History ==
The pastoral lease was first taken up by Henry McConville in 1864. At that time the property was also known as Mount Scott, and the station occupied an area of 890 square kilometres (342 sq mi). Shortly afterwards, the area was struck by drought until 1866. When the drought broke, the station's flock had been reduced to 3000 sheep. However the rains that broke the drought made the ground boggy and further reduced the flock to 500. McConville then entered a partnership with William Baines in both Myrtle Springs and neighbouring Mirrabuckina Station. The flock eventually increased to 11,000.

Baines and McConville placed the property on the market in late 1872, and it was bought by Alexander Borthwick Murray in partnership with George Tinline in 1873. At this time it occupied an area of 890 square kilometres (342 sq mi) and was stocked with 3000 sheep, 300 head of cattle and 50 horses. The property was advertised as having many improvements such as yards, huts and the headstation. It was estimated to have a carrying capacity of 29,000 sheep.

Murray and Tinline ran sheep on the property. In 1876 the area recorded good rains with about 50 millimetres (2 in) falling in a one-day period. This left the station isolated for a time and also caused the loss of 5,000 sheep and 17 horses.

By 1898 the lease was held by Leonard Browne who also held the lease to Leigh's Creek Station.

By 1907 the property was owned by the Matheson brothers who put it on the market the following year. The station occupied an area of 1,650 square kilometres (637 sq mi) and was stocked with 30,346 sheep.

Richard Dawes sold the property in 1920 to John Cowan and John Lindo. At this stage the station encompassed an area of 1,360 square kilometres (525 sq mi) and had an estimated carrying capacity of 50,000 sheep and 700 cattle.

Kidman estates disposed of Myrtle Springs, Witchelina, Mount Nor' West and Ediacra stations with a combined area of over 5,200 square kilometres (2,000 sq mi) in 1950. The purchasers were A. S. Toll, E. G. and J. L. Boynthon who had established the Myrtle Springs Pastoral company.

In 1954 Myrtle Springs was being managed by Maurice Smith, and the station consisted of 2,600 square kilometres (1,000 sq mi).

In April 2013, the land occupying the extent of the Myrtle Springs pastoral lease was gazetted by the Government of South Australia as a locality under the name "Myrtle Springs".

== See also ==
- List of ranches and stations
