= Barbara Hardy (environmentalist) =

Australian environmentalist and scientist (born 1927)

Barbara Hardy AO
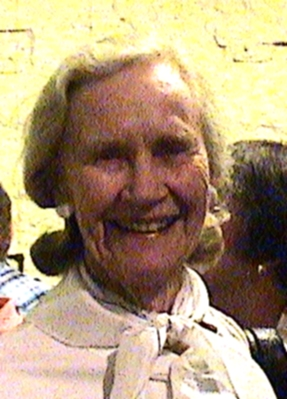
- Barbara Hardy in 2009
- Born: Barbara Begg; 31 March 1927 (age 99); Largs Bay, South Australia
- Education: University of Adelaide
- Known for: Environmental and climate change work

Barbara Rosemary Hardy AO (née Begg, born 31 March 1927) is an Australian environmentalist and scientist.

Hardy is the patron of the Barbara Hardy institute, affiliated with the University of South Australia. The Barbara Hardy Institute researches low carbon living and sustainable energy. Her research interests include renewable energy, biodiversity conservation and ecologically sustainable development.

== Biography ==
Barbara Rosemary Begg was born on 31 March 1927 in Largs Bay, South Australia. She completed her secondary education at Woodlands Girls' school by the age of 16 and enrolled in a science degree at the University of Adelaide. She later studied at Flinders University. Hardy has been volunteering in the environmental field since the 1970s.

Hardy volunteered at the Conservation Council of South Australia, starting in 1972, and then enrolled in a degree in earth sciences at Flinders University, in 1972. Hardy worked with the Minister for the Environment, David Wotton, in the 1970s and 1980s. She has worked for the Australian Heritage Commission, Landcare, the National Parks Foundation and the Investigator Science and Technology Centre.

Hardy was a co-founder in 1981, and as of 2022, a patron of Nature Foundation in South Australia. One of their properties, Hiltaba Nature Reserve, has a walking trail named after Hardy. She is also a patron of Friends of Parks Inc.

Her focus is ecologically sustainable development, renewable energy production, and biodiversity. At the University of South Australia, Hardy was a founding board member of the Sustainable Systems and Technology. She then became a patron of the Barbara Hardy Institute, at the University of South Australia. She is a proponent of citizen science, where scientific projects have participation from community members, with collaboration between members of the public and scientists. She believes that when members of the community have their voices heard, this can influence their behaviour and attitudes.

Hardy is a fellow of the Australian Institute of Energy, and was one of SA’s top 50 most influential Environmentalists. There has also been a Barbara Hardy wine label competition, for a designing a label for bottles of shiraz. She has won numerous prizes from 1987 to 2014, including multiple honorary degrees, over a span of five decades, and was one of Australia's early leaders in conservation.

== Awards ==
- 2015 - Australian Institute of Energy, SA Branch Hall of Fame Award
- 2014 - SA State Recipient, Senior Australian of the year
- 2011 – Adelaide Festival of Ideas was dedicated to Hardy
- 2011 – State Library of SA contained a display on Hardy's work
- 2010 – Honorary degree from the University of Adelaide
- 1993 – Honorary degree from Flinders University
- 1992 – Institution of Engineers Medal
- 1994 – Eureka award for the advancement of Science
- 1996 – SA Senior Australian of the year
- 1987 – Officer of the Order of Australia for "service to conservation and the community"
