= Witchelina Nature Reserve =

Pastoral lease converted to nature reserve in South Australia

Coordinates: 30.022°S 138.047°E

Location in South Australia

Witchelina Nature Reserve, in South Australia, is situated on a former pastoral lease known as Witchelina that had operated as both a sheep station and cattle station, before being converted into a nature reserve by the Nature Foundation. The station gave its name to the locality of Witchelina.

The property is situated approximately 72 kilometres (45 mi) northwest of Leigh Creek and 664 kilometres (413 mi) north of Adelaide. The country comprises gibber plains, red river gum and coolibah woodlands, bluebush shrubland, saltbush plains, and acacia dunefields.

== History ==
The traditional owners of the area are the Adnyamathanha and Arabunna peoples; Witchelina straddles of the boundary of both the groups' traditional lands. The property was first established as a sheep station by John Ragless in 1873.

Ragless' sons, Frederick and Richard, left Witchelina in 1882 with 2,500 sheep and three station hands to open up a property east of Lake Callabonna; after some poor seasons, the brothers abandoned the run in 1886.

In 1915 the property was carrying a flock of approximately 4,000 sheep. The Ragless brothers placed Witchelina on the market in 1916, at this time it occupied an area of 485 square miles (1,256 km^{2}) with a 10-room homestead, a 20-stand shearing shed and a complete boundary fence. Sidney Kidman acquired the property in partnership with Lewis and Pearce.

Following a heat wave in 1932, the station manager, Mr. Gourlay, trapped an estimated 100,000 rabbits, including 5,000 in a single night.

In 1949, the area had good rains, although several miles of boundary fence at Witchelina were washed away. Kidman estates disposed of Witchelina, Mount Nor' West, Myrtle Springs and Ediacra stations with a combined area of over 2,000 square miles (5,180 km^{2}) in 1950. The purchasers were A. S. Toll, E. G. and J. L. Boynthon, who had established the Myrtle Springs Pastoral company.

The 4,219-square-kilometre (1,629 sq mi) property was on the market in 2009. The property boasts a stone two-story homestead, a three bedroom manager's house, a ten-room shearers' quarters, a six-stone shearing shed, and significant shedding around the holding. The property is rated to carry either 6,600 head of cattle or 33,000 sheep.

In 2010, Nature Foundation SA purchased the property with two-thirds of the funds provided by a Federal Government grant via the Caring for Our Country program, with strong assistance from some private donors and State Government land purchase funds. The station was reported as being the state's largest private nature reserve, forming "a vital habitat link for Lake Torrens into the Northern Territory".

== See also ==
- Hiltaba Nature Reserve
- List of ranches and stations
