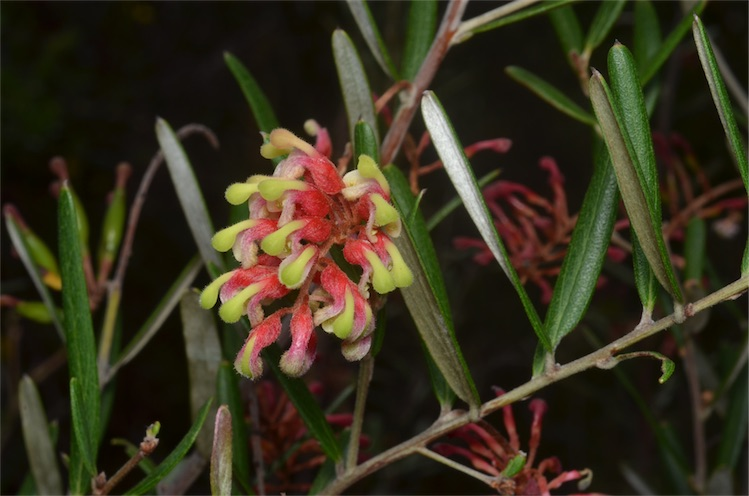
- In Hincks Conservation Park

Conservation status
- Priority One — Poorly Known Taxa (DEC)

- Least Concern (IUCN 3.1)

Scientific classification
- Kingdom: Plantae
- Clade: Embryophytes
- Clade: Tracheophytes
- Clade: Spermatophytes
- Clade: Angiosperms
- Clade: Eudicots
- Order: Proteales
- Family: Proteaceae
- Genus: Grevillea
- Species: G. aspera

Binomial name
- Grevillea aspera R.Br.

= Grevillea aspera =

Species of shrub native to Australia

Grevillea aspera, commonly known as the rough grevillea, is a species of flowering plant in the family Proteaceae and is endemic to Australia, occurring mainly in South Australia. It is low, spreading to erect shrub with oblong to egg-shaped leaves with the narrower end towards the base, and pinkish to red and cream-coloured, green, yellow or white flowers.

== Description ==
Grevillea aspera is a low, spreading to erect shrub that typically grows to a height of 0.6–2.5 m (2 ft 0 in – 8 ft 2 in) and has woolly-hairy branchlets. The leaves are oblong to egg-shaped with the narrower end towards the base, 15–80 mm (0.59–3.15 in) long and 3–12 mm (0.12–0.47 in) wide and hairy on the lower surface. The flowers are arranged in large groups in leaf axils and on the ends of branchlets on a rachis 15–50 mm (0.59–1.97 in) long, each flower on a pedicel 2.5–5 mm (0.098–0.197 in) long. The lower half of the perianth is pinkish to red, the outer half cream-coloured, green, yellow or white and the pistil is 7.5–10.5 mm (0.30–0.41 in) long. Flowering occurs from May to November and the fruit is a narrow oval follicle 13–17 mm (0.51–0.67 in) long.

== Taxonomy ==
Grevillea aspera was first formally described in 1810 by Robert Brown in Transactions of the Linnean Society of London. The specific epithet (aspera) means "rough to the touch".

== Distribution and habitat ==
Rough grevillea grows in heath, scrub and woodland in the Gawler Range, parts of the Flinders Range and the Eyre Peninsula in South Australia. In Western Australia it is only known from the Rawlinson Range in the far east of the state.

== Conservation status ==
In Western Australia, G. aspera is listed as priority one by the Government of Western Australia Department of Biodiversity, Conservation and Attractions, meaning that it is known from only one or a few locations which are potentially at risk. ^{A}

In South Australia, it is listed as least concern on the IUCN Red List of Threatened Species. It is described as being a reasonably common species with typically stable populations. ^{A}

It is not listed on the EPBC Act List of Threatened Flora.

== Notes ==
A. Both the Western Australian Government and IUCN Red List statuses represent different isolated populations of the species, the first being Western Australia's population and the latter being the South Australian population.
