= Mount Nor' West =

Pastoral lease in South Australia

Coordinates: 29.9632°S 137.7049°E

Location in South Australia

Mount Nor' West Station is a pastoral lease in outback South Australia that once operated as a sheep station but is now a cattle station.

It is located approximately 30 kilometres (19 mi) south of Marree and 50 kilometres (31 mi) north west of Lyndhurst.

== History ==
The lease was taken up by Henry McConville in 1874, when it occupied an area of approximately 2,000 square kilometres (700 sq mi). McConville already owned Myrtle Springs Station and would later acquire Witchelina and Angepena Stations.

The station was acquired by Sidney Kidman at some time before 1899. At this time only a few cattle were being run on the eastern side of the property. In 1908 a flock of 14,053 sheep were shorn at the station. and the size of the station was recorded as being only 850 square kilometres (330 sq mi).

In 1950, Kidman's estate disposed of Mount Nor' West, along with Witchelina, Myrtle Springs and Ediacara stations with a combined area of over 5,000 square kilometres (2,000 sq mi). The purchasers were A.S. Toll, E.G. and J.L. Bonython, who had established the Myrtle Springs Pastoral Company.

== See also ==
- List of ranches and stations
