= Adelaide Festival of Ideas =

Festival in Adelaide, South Australia

- Status: Active
- Locations: Adelaide, South Australia
- Coordinates: 34.91898°S 138.599986°E
- Country: South Australia
- Established: 1999
- Founder: Greg Mackie OAM
- Most recent: 2021
- Sponsors: University of Adelaide, City of Adelaide
- Website: adelaidefestivalofideas.com.au
- The oldest festival of ideas

The Adelaide Festival of Ideas (AFOI) is a festival held in Adelaide, South Australia since 1999, usually biennially. It aims to foster the public promulgation, discussion and critique of culturally and socially relevant ideas from around the world. In 2021 it was held from Thursday 15 July to Sunday 18 July, under the auspices of a new and larger festival called Illuminate Adelaide, which ran from 16 July to 1 August.

== History ==
Founded by Greg Mackie OAM, the AFOI first ran in 1999, and then every two years after that until 2013. From 1999-2009 the AFOI was produced under the auspices of the Adelaide Festival Corporation. The 2011 AFOI was auspiced by the South Australian Department of the Premier and Cabinet - Cultural Development Group, and the 2013 AFOI was produced under the auspices of The Adelaide Film Festival Corporation, all with significant baseline funding from Arts SA. However, after this funding ceased late in 2014, the AFOI was relaunched as a non-profit incorporated association in 2015 in order to present the AFOI in 2016 and annually thereafter.

From 1999 until 2009 it ran in July; in 2011, 2013 and 2016 it ran in October; and in 2018, the festival was held for three days in July.

From the inaugural 1999 event, the AFOI program grew steadily from 28 sessions involving 27 speakers, to 88 sessions and 132 speakers (including session chairs) in the 2013 event. Each AFOI has an overarching theme within which the sessions are programmed. Themes have included: "Hope and Fear" (2003), "Pushing the Limits" (2009), "Planning for Uncertainty" (2011), and "The real value of ..." (2013).

Earlier festivals were dedicated to a prominent South Australian who has had a significant impact on the development of ideas across a wide range of domains, be they geographical, intellectual, cultural or social. Dedicatees include Lowitja O'Donoghue (2003), Frank Fenner (2009), Barbara Hardy, environmentalist (2011) and Paul Davies (2013).

== Description ==
The Adelaide Festival of Ideas offers intellectual debate across conventional boundaries and demarcations of disciplines, agendas and cultural norms with the aim of challenging the fragmentation of public knowledge.

In 2021 AFOI ran from Thursday 15 July to Sunday 18 July, under the auspices of the new and larger festival called Illuminate Adelaide, which ran from Friday 16 July to Sunday 1 August.

== Past festivals ==
12–15 July 2018, "Who's at the Wheel?"

The 2018 festival ran for three days in July, featuring Robyn Archer, former president of the Australian Human Rights Commission Gillian Triggs, language revivalist Ghil'ad Zuckermann, historian Stuart Macintyre and author Benjamin Law.

21–23 October 2016, "Make or Break"

The 2016 festival hosted around 70 guests and 48 sessions, and was dedicated to Phillip Adams AO, FAHA, FRSA

17–20 October 2013, "The real value of..."

The 2013 festival ran in conjunction with the Adelaide Film Festival. The speakers were asked think about what matters are of real significance rather than currently publicised in their fields, and to discuss "the real value of...". It was dedicated to physicist and science communicator Paul Davies.

7–9 October 2011, "Planning for Certainty"

The theme of the 2011 AFOI was "[planning] with reasonable probability to shape the improbabilities that confront us as individuals or a community". It was dedicated to environmentalist, Barbara Hardy AO, who was the 2014 SA Recipient of the Senior Australian of the Year award.

9–12 July 2009, "Pushing the Limits"

The 2009 AFOI looked a range of issues relating to "the power and consequences of the ethic of exploration and expansion which shaped, and perhaps risked, the modern world". It was dedicated to virologist Frank Fenner AC CMG MBE .

5–9 July 2007, "Which Way to the Future?"

The 2007 AFOI focussed on the future for all of us, assuming a set of desirable aims, asking "How do we get there? How do we bequeath a better world for our children?". It was dedicated to jurist and Royal Commissioner, Elliott Johnston QC.

7–10 July 2005, "What is to be Done?"

The 2005 AFOI explored how ideas could be transformed into action. It was dedicated to medical researcher, Basil Hetzel AC.

10–13 July 2003, "Hope and Fear"

The theme for the 2003 AFOI was chosen before the September 11 attacks, and before the Tampa-Children Overboard affair. The 2003 AFOI was dedicated to Aboriginal leader Lowitja O'Donoghue AC, CBE, DSG.

12–15 July 2001, "Scarcity and Abundance"

AFOI sessions covered a range of topics, including water, population, addiction, intoxication, and reconciliation. It was dedicated to prominent lawyer and social activist, Sir Ronald Wilson AC KBE CMG QC.

9–11 July 1999, Unthemed

The inaugural AFOI examined a diverse range of topics: international relations, including the changing nature of community, truth in the media, the notion of good and evil, and the potential of new technologies.
