= Hiltaba Nature Reserve =

Pastoral lease converted to nature reserve in South Australia

Coordinates: 32.16°S 135.07°E

Location in South Australia

Hiltaba Nature Reserve is located in the north of the Eyre Peninsula on the western edge of the Gawler Ranges, South Australia. It is situated on a former pastoral lease known as Hiltaba, or Hiltaba Station, that had operated as a sheep station. It is owned by the Nature Foundation, which purchased the property in 2012.

== History ==
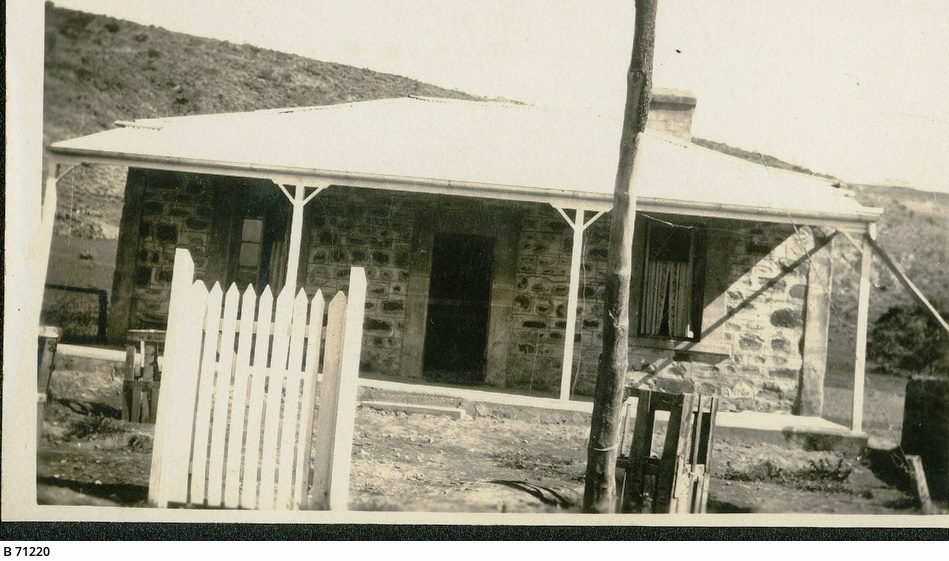
Old Hiltaba homestead, 1925

The traditional owners of the Gawler Ranges are the Barngarla, Kokatha, and Wirangu peoples, who have inhabited the area for at least 30,000 years and are known collectively as the Gawler Ranges Aboriginal People. The tribal land of a man called "Whipstick Billy", who was "one of the last Gawler Ranges natives" still alive by around 1910, was said to have been centred on Hiltaba.

Around 1844, John Charles Darke explored the region, using an ox-drawn cart (known as a bullock dray in Australia). Around 1857, Aboriginal guides led a government-equipped party with pack horses, headed by Stephen Hack from Streaky Bay, through the Gawler Ranges, on a search for sheep-farming land. Hiltaba was one of the first three pastoral leases taken up in the area in the 1860s, along with Yardea and Paney Station, all with names of Aboriginal origin. Hiltaba was also referred to as "Hiltruby" and "Hiltaby", and it is not known which comes closest to the Aboriginal name for the area. James Hiern took up the Hiltaba lease in 1868, and later sold it to his business partner Anton Schlinke, who had migrated from Prussia in the 1840s. Schlinke, after adding many improvements to the property, was not able to farm it successfully owing to rabbits and dingoes (rabbits provided food for the dingoes, leading to large numbers, so both became pests), so he gave the lease back to the Crown, after which it remained unoccupied for years. Much later, his son William took over the lease.

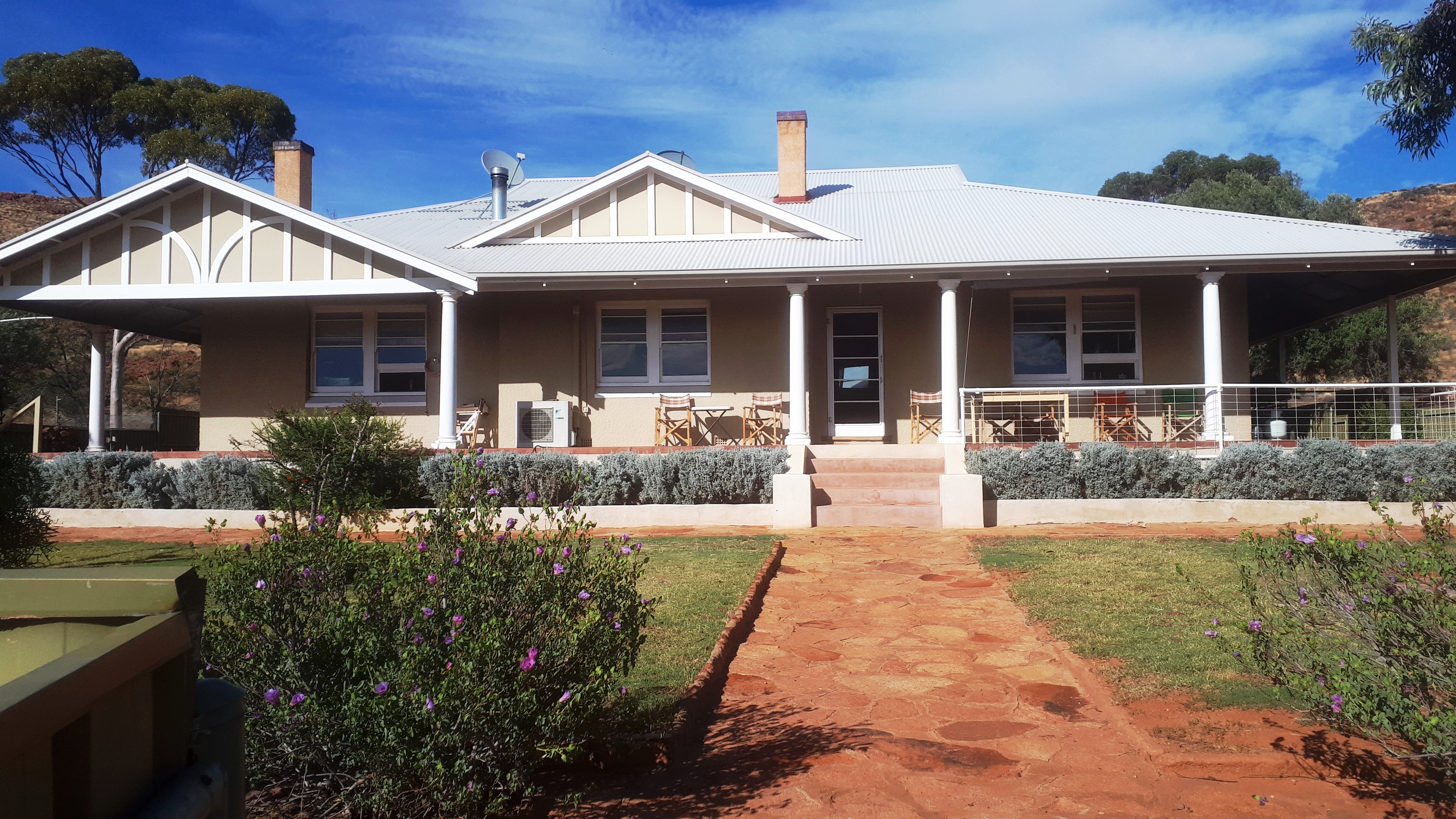
Homestead built by Jack "Slinger" Nitschke

Yardea was the only permanent station west of the ranges, although over time the boundaries, owners, and managers changed, and occasionally the station was only utilised for winter pasture. The original (now roofless) residence and the dam were constructed by the Fitzgerald brothers, who resided there from approximately 1892 until 1912. The lease was purchased by Carl Hermann Nitschke in 1918 and has been in his family ever since. His son, test cricketer Homesdale Nitschke (aka "Jack" or "Slinger"), owned the property for some time. He built the present homestead in 1936, before his marriage.

Cattle were introduced from time to time, but the numbers of both cattle and sheep fluctuated. In 1918, there were about 2,000 sheep and a few hundred cattle; by 1939, there were 11,500 sheep. Cattle were removed from the property in the 1960s. Rabbits, dingoes, kangaroos, feral goats, irregular rainfall, and saline water all contributed to making it hard to make a good living out of farming on the property.

The MacLachlan family purchased Hiltaba in 1986, in 1995 transferring it to Janet Angas (née MacLachlan) and her husband Alastair.

After the Millennium drought caused the end of using the property as a sheep station, it was restocked. The SA Department of Environment, Water & Natural Resources (DEWNR) noticed that the property was for sale around 2011, and encouraged the Nature Foundation to acquire it. Hiltaba Station was bought by the Nature Foundation in 2012, with the assistance of the Federal Government's Caring for Our Country fund and the Government of South Australia, with the intention of returning the property to its natural state.

One of the main purposes of creating the nature reserve is to help to create an almost completely unbroken east–west corridor of nearly 750 km (470 mi) across which the native animals, including the yellow-footed rock wallaby, could move freely. All sheep were removed from the area, and by the time of its opening as a reserve (although not yet to the public) on 3 May 2013, around 6500 feral goats had been removed. Workers were continuing to shoot feral cats and lay down bait for foxes. There was a special dedication at the opening ceremony to Damien Pearce, a DEWNR employee who had worked hard to achieve the corridor in the arid lands but died in 2010, before the purchase of the property.

In 2018 two budget bush campgrounds were opened on the property: one at Pretty Point, with only a toilet, no showers, while the one at the Old Shearers Quarters has showers and toilets.

== Description ==
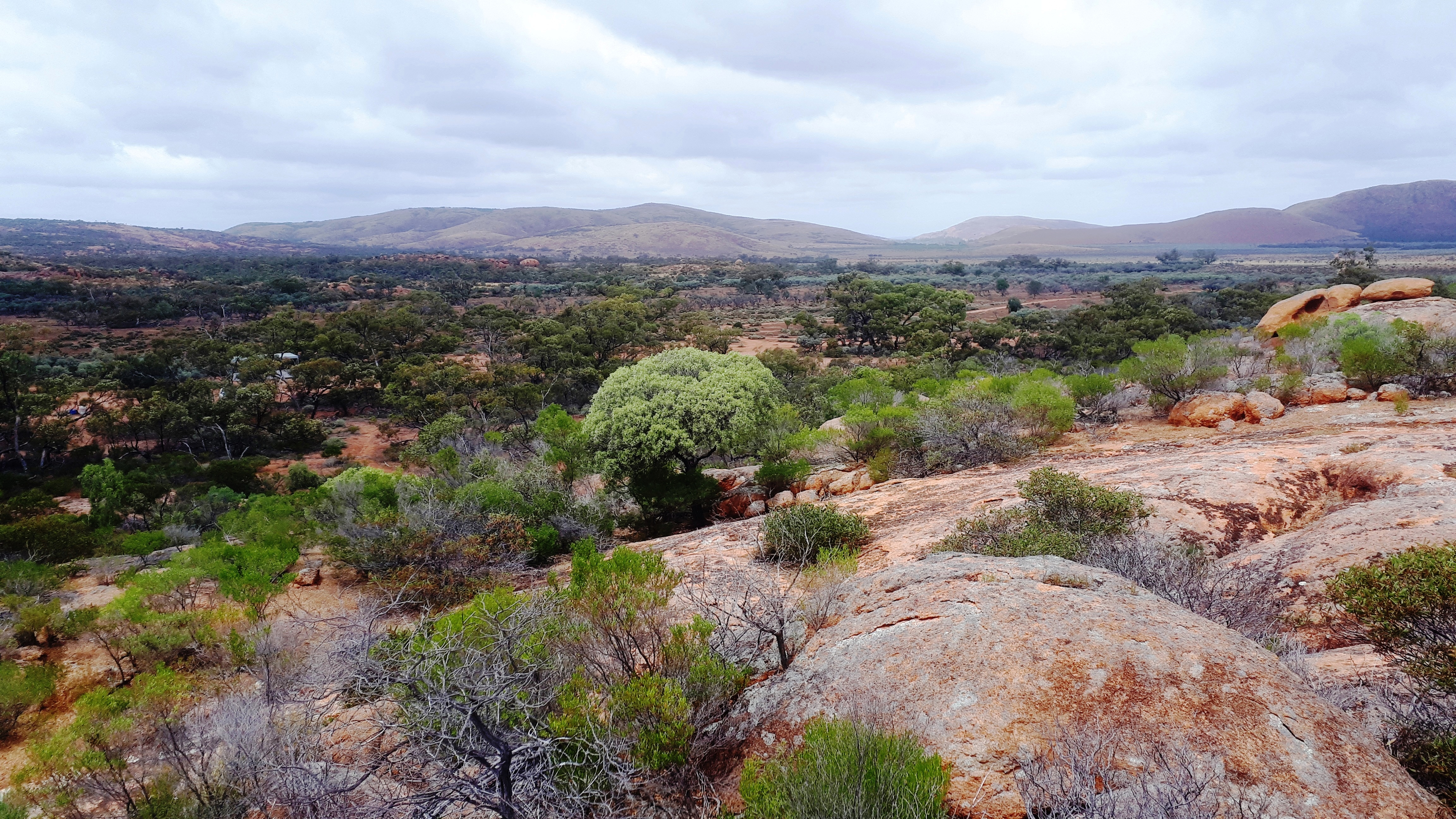
View on Hiltaba Nature Reserve

Hiltaba Nature Reserve adjoins the Gawler Ranges National Park, which is managed by the South Australian Department for Environment & Water, in consultation with the traditional owners. It lies north of the park, around 70 km (43 mi) north of Poochera (population 59 in 2016), with the town of Wudinna (population 549 in 2016), around 110 km (68 mi) away. The area is part of the northern Eyre Peninsula. Not far from its western border lies the Yellabinna Regional Reserve.

The 78,000 ha (190,000-acre) property has granite formations, grasslands and woodlands that provide habitat for native plants and animals. Scientific surveys recorded 21 potentially new spider species and 13 species of snails.

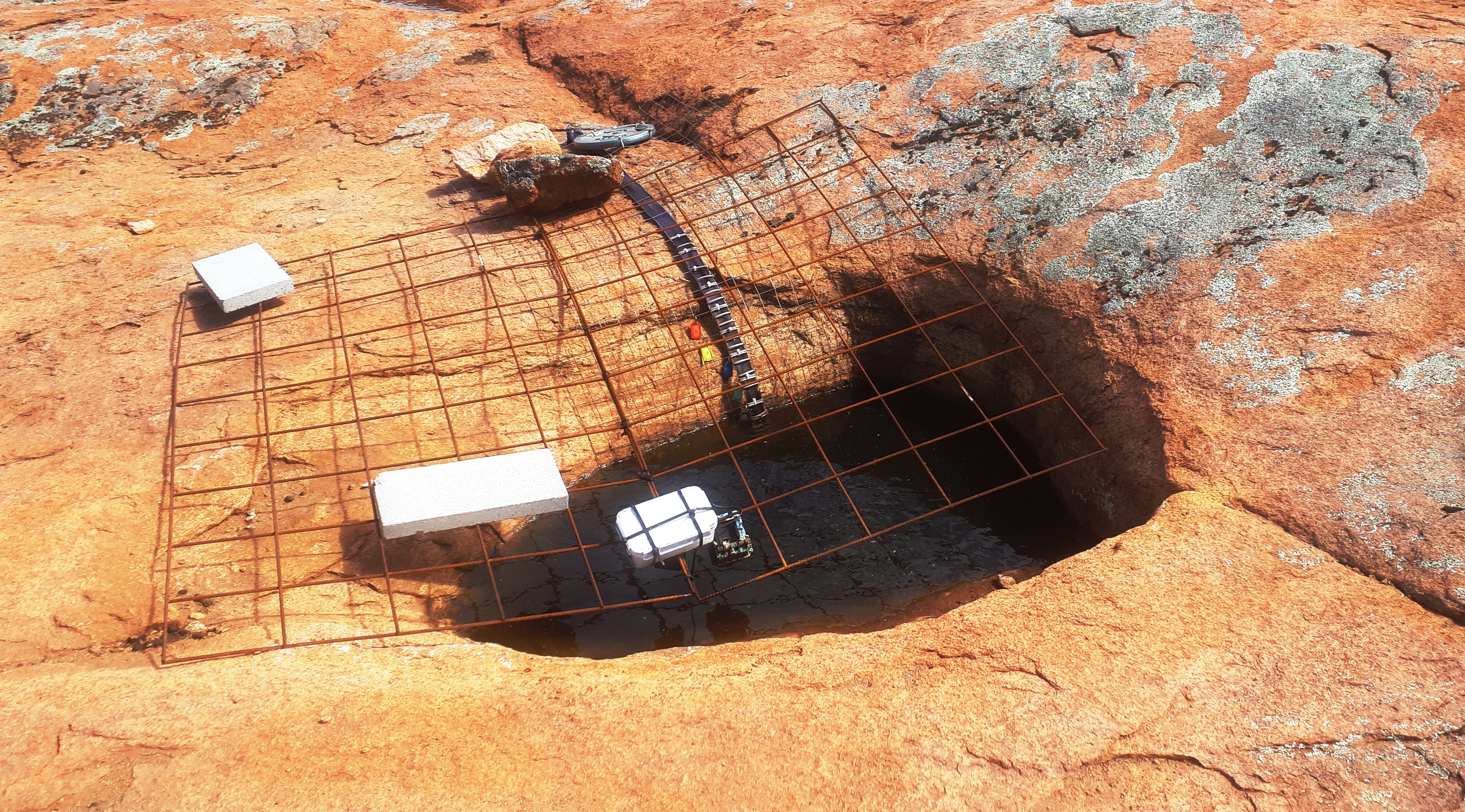
Rock hole (gnamma) on Hiltaba Nature Reserve

Rock holes in the granite, which gather rain water and are of Aboriginal cultural significance, are maintained on the property. These rock holes are notable for supporting a diverse community of freshwater invertebrates, as well as providing a source of freshwater for wildlife on the reserve.

The foundation has created driving and walking tracks, as well as fireplaces and accessible fuel for campers. The property remains a pastoral lease, and adjoining landholders help to manage issues like stray stock, dingoes, and feral goats.

Apart from the substantial bungalow built by Slinger Nitschke, there are also several other structures on the property:

- The woolshed, which has been substantially restored by volunteers
- Shearers' Quarters, now used as accommodation for guests
- Several dams
- The original home built by the Fitzgerald brothers
- The "Governes's cottage
- The grave of an 11-month-old infant who lived in Kondoolka Station to the north-west, who died on the way to Streaky Bay hospital by horse and cart

== Flora and fauna ==
Several species of both plants and animals identified on a "Bush Blitz" survey in 2012 are rare species, endangered species, or vulnerable species, according to the National Parks and Wildlife Act 1972 (SA). The acacia shrublands, casuarina woodlands, mallee forest, and tussock grasslands provide habitat for over 40 state-listed species and nine species listed by the Government of Australia (under the Environment Protection and Biodiversity Conservation Act 1999).

Notable species include:

Fauna

- Slender-billed thornbill
- Short-tailed grasswren
- Yellow-footed rock-wallaby

Flora

- Delicate podolepis (copper-wire daisy)
- Desert greenhood orchid
- Gawler Ranges hop bush
- Gawler Ranges slipper-plant

Other plant species that can be seen on the property include bullock bush, eucalyptus socialis (a type of mallee), lobe-leaf hop bush (Dodonaea lobulata), paperbark, black oak, native apricot, and western myall.

There are many species of kangaroos and wallabies, as well as southern hairy-nosed wombats, echidnas, dunnarts, and various types of lizards, including Gould's goannas, black-headed monitors, and snakes. Bird species include the emu, mulga parrot, and Port Lincoln parrot.

== Geological significance ==
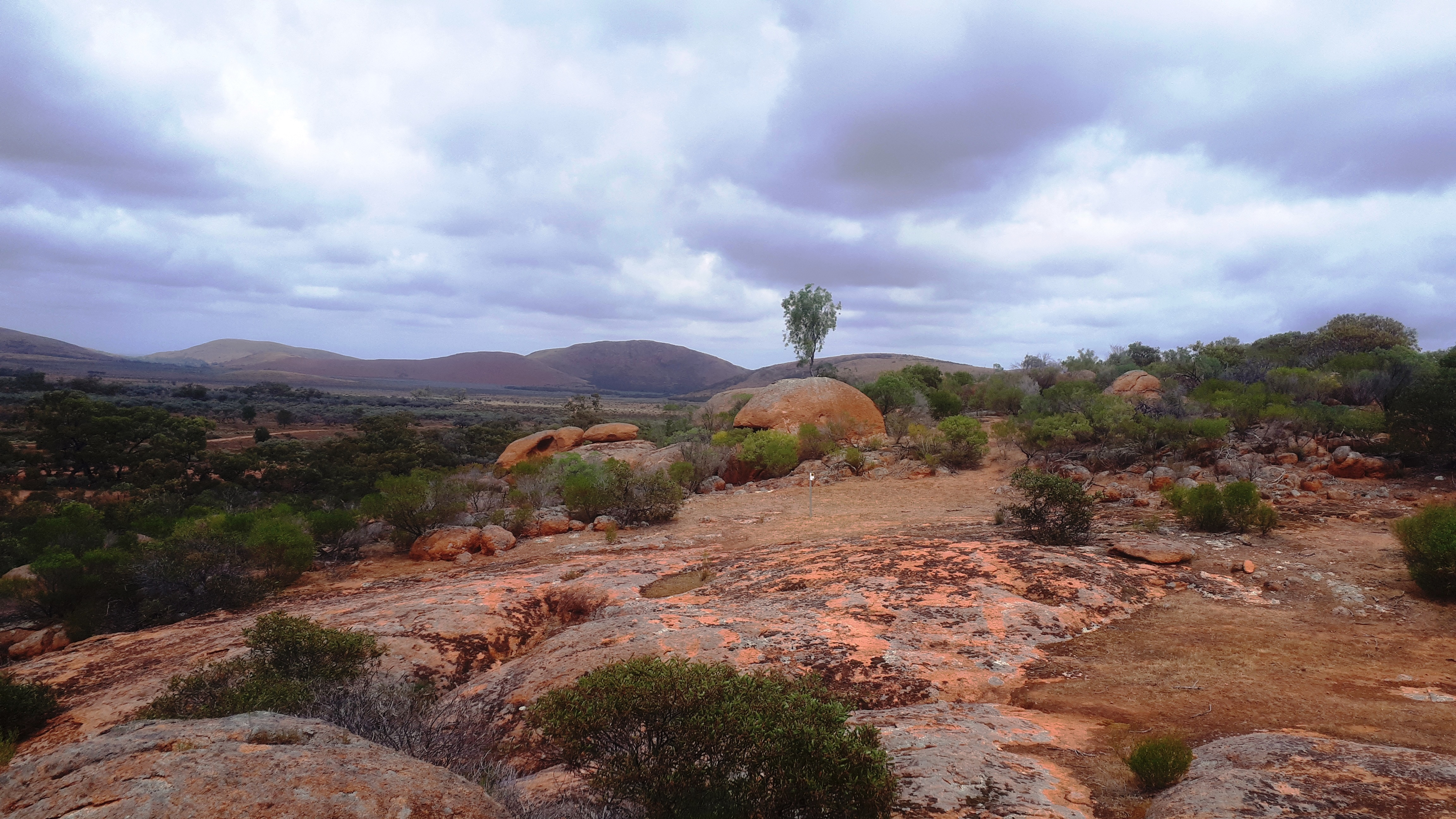
Pink granite at Hiltaba

The geology of the area is highly complex and of great significance. It was once part of the large earlier continent that was joined to Adélie Land, now in Antarctica. The Gawler Ranges are part of the geologically significant Gawler craton, which began to be formed nearly 3 billion years ago, completing its current complex formation around 2 billion years ago. The Craton was subsequently subjected to two huge events: the first being a succession of huge volcanic eruptions, around 1592 million years ago (the Gawler Range Volcanics, or GRV), and the second about a billion years later, when an immense meteorite or asteroid crashed into the site of the current Lake Acraman, just north of the reserve.

The Gawler Range Volcanics and the Hiltaba Suite granite form a Mesoproterozoic SLIP, or Silicic-dominated Large Igneous Province, covering a large area in the central Gawler craton. There are only a few recognised SLIPs in the world, with this one known as the Gawler SLIP.

Mount Hiltaba (450 m (1,480 ft) is one of the highest peaks in the Gawler Ranges and has a large cairn at the top. There are also cairns on Mount St Mungo and Mount Friday, being erected as trig points.

In 2015 to 2016 detailed geological mapping was undertaken as part of mineral exploration, as the property lies in the Iron Oxide Copper Gold province of the GRV.

== Kids on Country ==
The Nature Foundation runs the "Kids on Country" program at both Hiltaba and the Witchelina Nature Reserve. In the third camp of the programme at Hiltaba in 2018, 16 students aged from 12 to 14 years old from Ceduna spent a week on the property, where they helped to improve the property as a nature reserve, while at the same time learning about Aboriginal peoples' unique connection to country, along with STEM learning. The aim was to help the children to connect the Aboriginal, palaeontological, and geological stories of the area. The students helped to prepare bush tucker such as kangaroo tail and wombat meat, and to clean the rock holes.

Educators, Aboriginal elders, and Indigenous rangers are involved in the programme.

== For visitors ==
The park is open today and staying visitors between 1 April and 31 October. There are two bush campgrounds, 9 rooms for up to 17 people at the Shearers' Quarters, and two cottages accommodating five people each. There are numerous walking and driving tracks, with the five walks named after the founders and other early supporters of the foundation.

== See also ==
- List of ranches and stations
