= Gawler Ranges =

Mountain range in South Australia

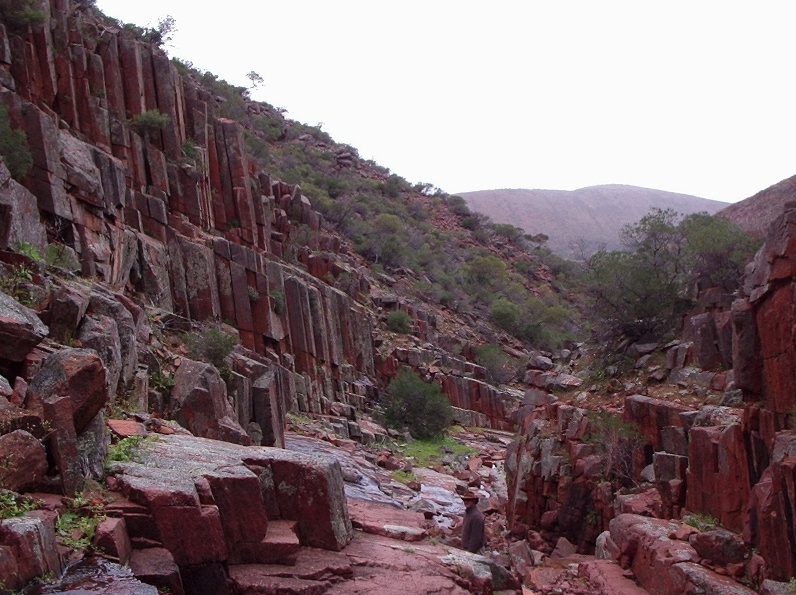
- Columnar jointing in rhyolite at the "Organ Pipes" waterfall in the ranges

Highest point
- Peak: Nukey Bluff
- Elevation: 465 m (1,526 ft)

Geography
- Country: Australia
- State: South Australia
- Region: Eyre Peninsula
- Range coordinates: 32°32′S 135°22′E

Geology
- Rock age: Mesoproterozoic
- Rock type: Felsic Volcanics

The Gawler Ranges are a range of stoney hills in South Australia to the north of the Eyre Peninsula. The Eyre Highway skirts the south of the ranges. The Gawler Ranges National Park is in the ranges north of Kimba and Wudinna. The ranges are covered by the Gawler Ranges Native Title Claim.

== History ==
Wagon on the Mail road, near Thurlga turnoff

The traditional owners of the Gawler Ranges are the Barngarla, Kokatha and Wirangu peoples, who have inhabited the area for at least 30,000 years and are now known collectively as the Gawler Ranges Aboriginal People. These Aboriginal peoples maintained and used rock holes in the granite rock formations as a water source.

The ranges were named by Edward John Eyre after the Governor of South Australia, George Gawler in 1839. This was on one of Eyre's earlier expeditions before his famous crossing of the Nullarbor Plain further west. It was on this expedition that Edward John Eyre made the first recorded sighting of South Australia's floral emblem, the Sturt desert pea, in 1839 during an early exploration of the region.

Stephen Hack explored the range in 1856 and in 1857 the first pastoral lease was taken up in the area, Yardea, which was set up on the site of a former Aboriginal camp and included a freshwater spring later used as the station's water source. More sheep stations were soon established, including Hiltaba and Paney Station. Two good seasons followed in 1857 and 1858, with pastoralists reporting permanent freshwater lakes on their runs. Stations were required to stock 50 sheep per square mile (19 per square kilometre) but soon properties such as Nonning were shearing flocks of 90,000.

The first mail service from Port Augusta to Yardea commenced in 1876, with the telegraph service to Western Australia that passes through the range commencing in 1903.

== Geology ==
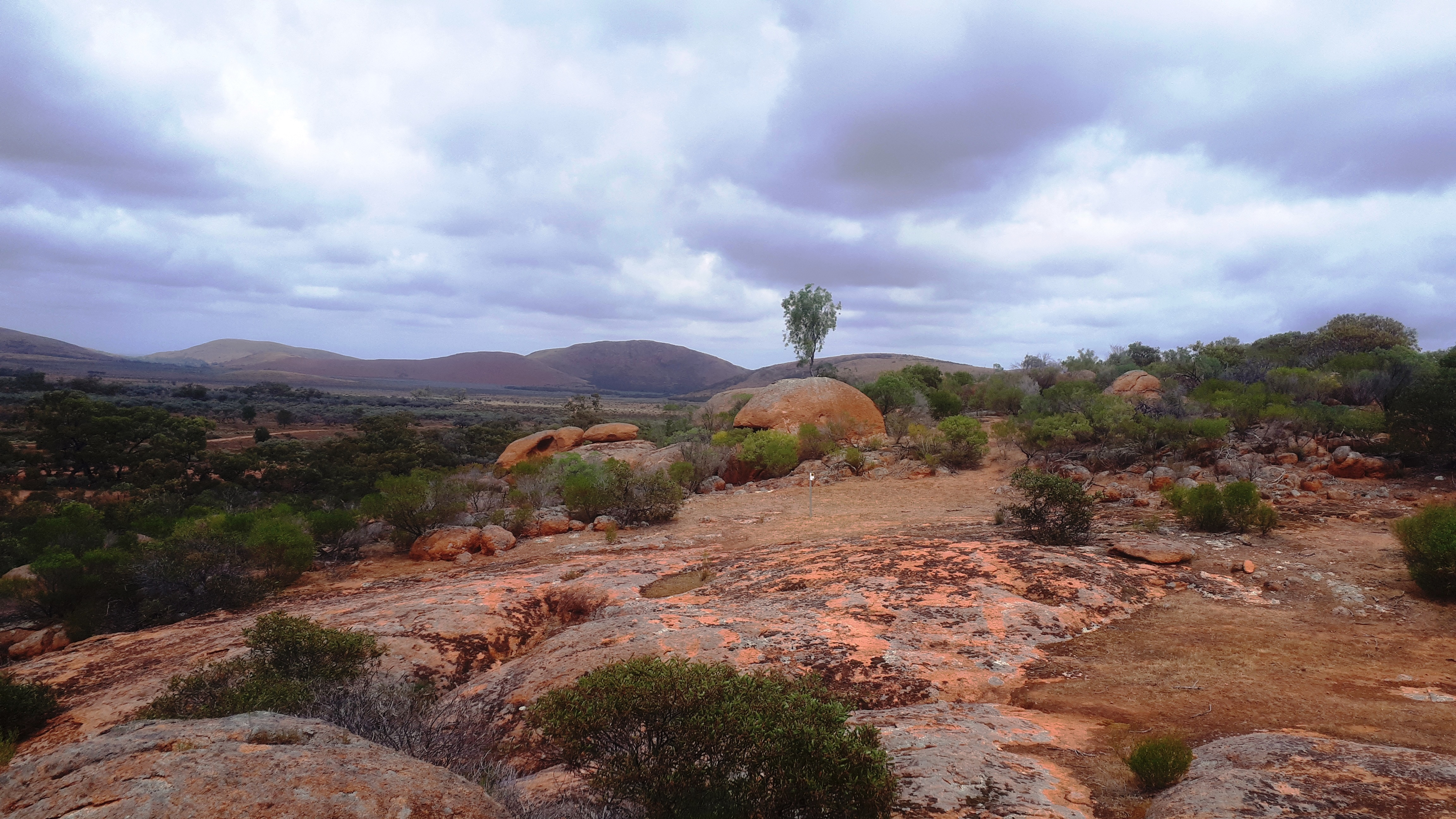
Pink granite at Hiltaba Nature Reserve

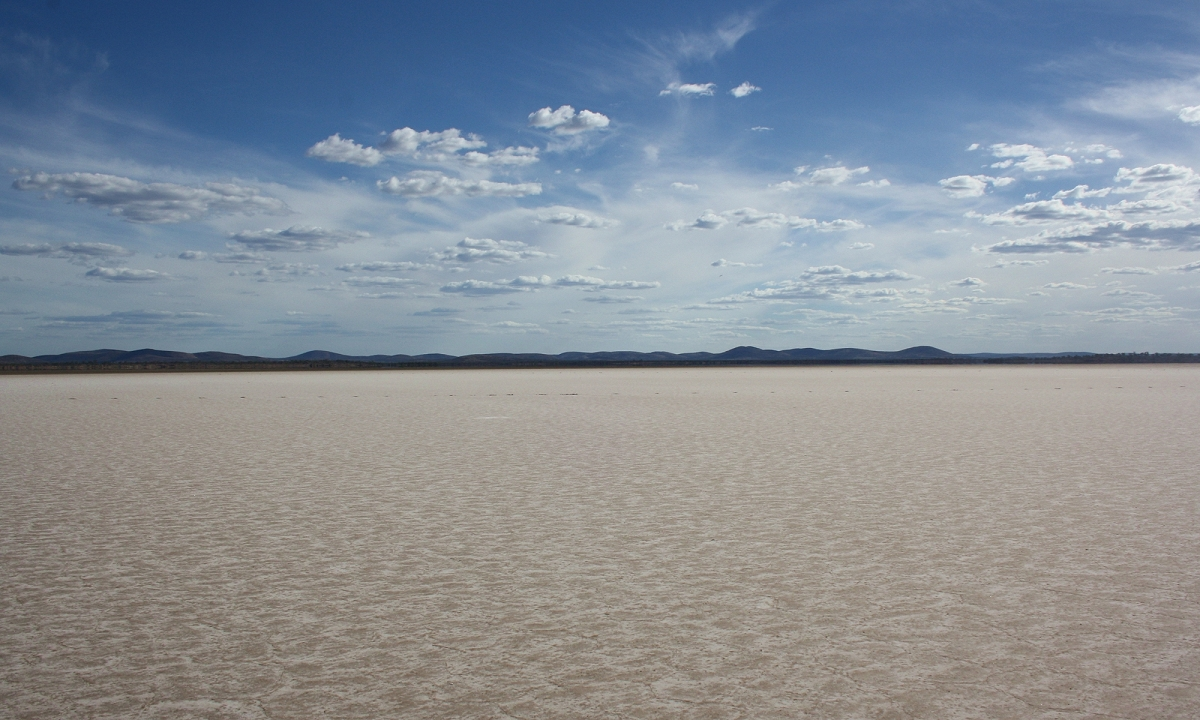
Acraman Salt Lake with Gawler Range in background

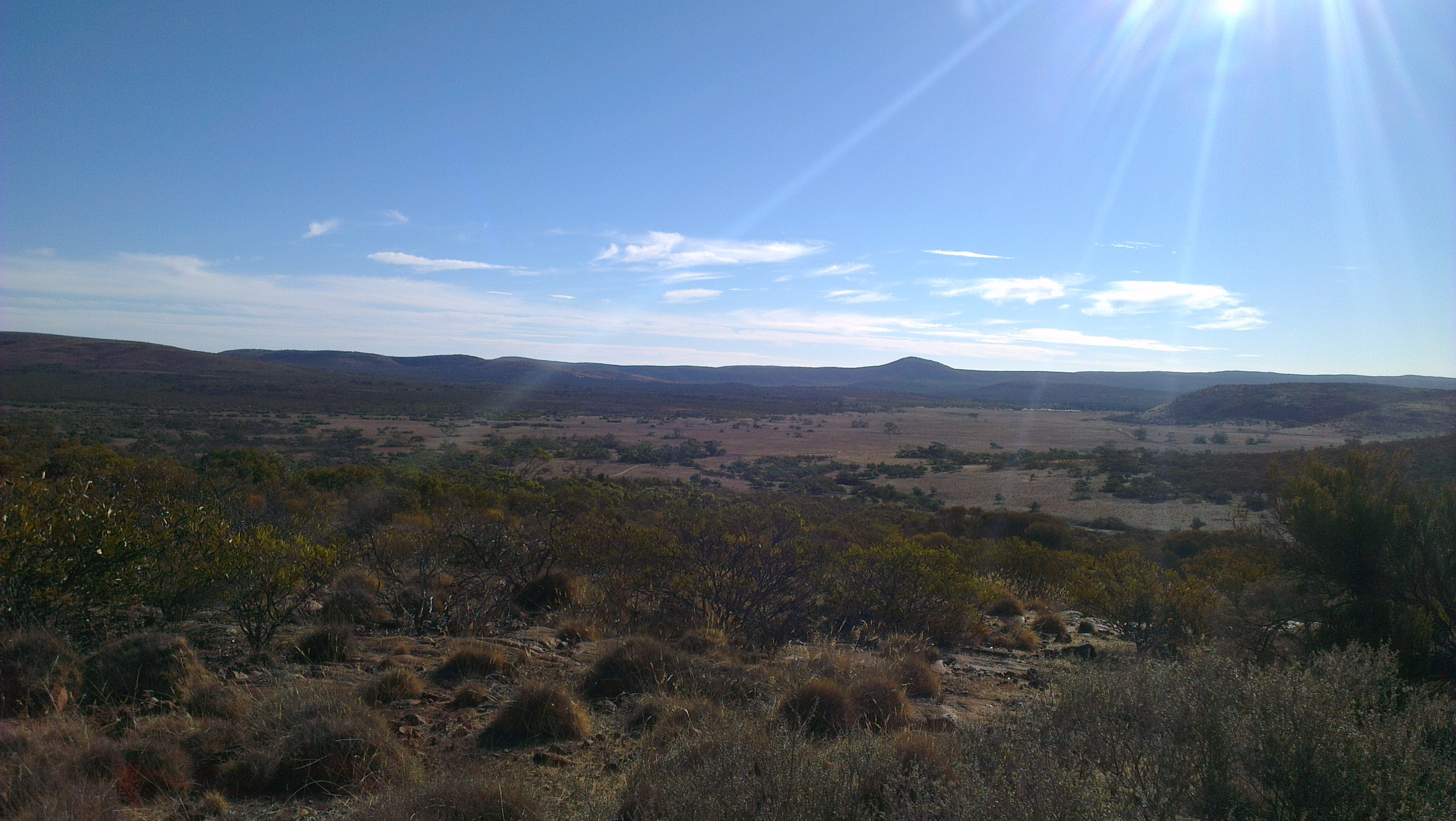
Conical Hill Track in the Gawler Range

The rocks within the ranges were formed by volcanic activity between ~1595-1592 Ma, when the Gawler Range Volcanics (GRV) were erupted. Approximately 30 000 km^{3} of dominantly rhyolitic and dacitic lava were rapidly extruded, and their eroded remnants preserve one of the most voluminous felsic magmatic events preserved on earth. Basaltic and basaltic-andesite comprise a remarkably minor component of the magmatism (<1%). The Gawler Ranges Volcanics were also erupted at remarkably high temperatures (~950-1100 °C) for felsic magmas, and this, coupled with their very high halogen (particularly F and Cl) compositions resulted in low viscosity (runny) magmas when compared to typical rhyolites and dacites which are generally several hundred degrees cooler. This low viscosity resulted in emplacement as a series of lobate flows with a stacked pancake-like morphology which cooled rapidly resulting in porphyritic textures and widespread columnar jointing. The ranges are a small part of the Gawler craton which is a craton rich in mineral resources, although many are only recently discovered and not yet fully exploited.

There is much pink granite in some areas, including on the Hiltaba Nature Reserve on the western side of the ranges, which is located on Hiltaba Suite granite.

At approximately 580Ma the Gawler Ranges were impacted by a large meteorite which excavated the Acraman impact crater, in which the modern Lake Acraman now sits. The original crater was possibly as large as 90 km in diameter and flung fist-sized debris several hundred kilometres to the east, where it has been preserved in sediments which now comprise the Flinders Ranges.

=== Geomorphology ===
The highest point is Nukey Bluff at 465 metres (1,526 ft) above sea level. Bornhardts dominate the landscape. Soils are invariably dominated by the weathering products of the volcanics, and are typically red in colour due to abundant oxidised iron weathering in the arid environment. No major rivers drain the ranges, however several internal catchments feed the modern playa lakes Gairdner, Acraman, Everard, McFarlane, Harry and Island Lagoon.

== Flora and fauna ==
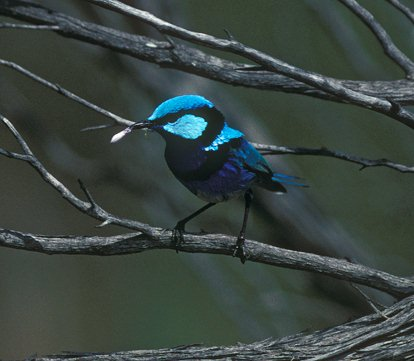
Splendid fairywren in the Gawler Range

=== Birds ===
There are some 140 species of birds in the Gawler Ranges, including the emu, wedge-tailed eagle, pink cockatoo and singing honeyeater.

=== Mammals ===
The Gawler Ranges are home to several larger mammals, like the southern hairy-nosed wombat and the endangered yellow-footed rock wallaby.

== Nature reserve ==
The Hiltaba Nature Reserve, owned by Nature Foundation, abuts the Gawler Ranges National Park to the north, and works to protect many threatened species.

== See also ==
- List of mountains in Australia
