= Feral goats in Australia =

Invasive animal species in Australia

Feral goats are an invasive animal species in Australia. First arriving in the 18th century with European settlers, feral goat populations originated from escaped domestic individuals. Today, feral goats are found across Australia, where they cause economic and environmental damage through overgrazing and competition with livestock and native marsupials.

== Distribution ==
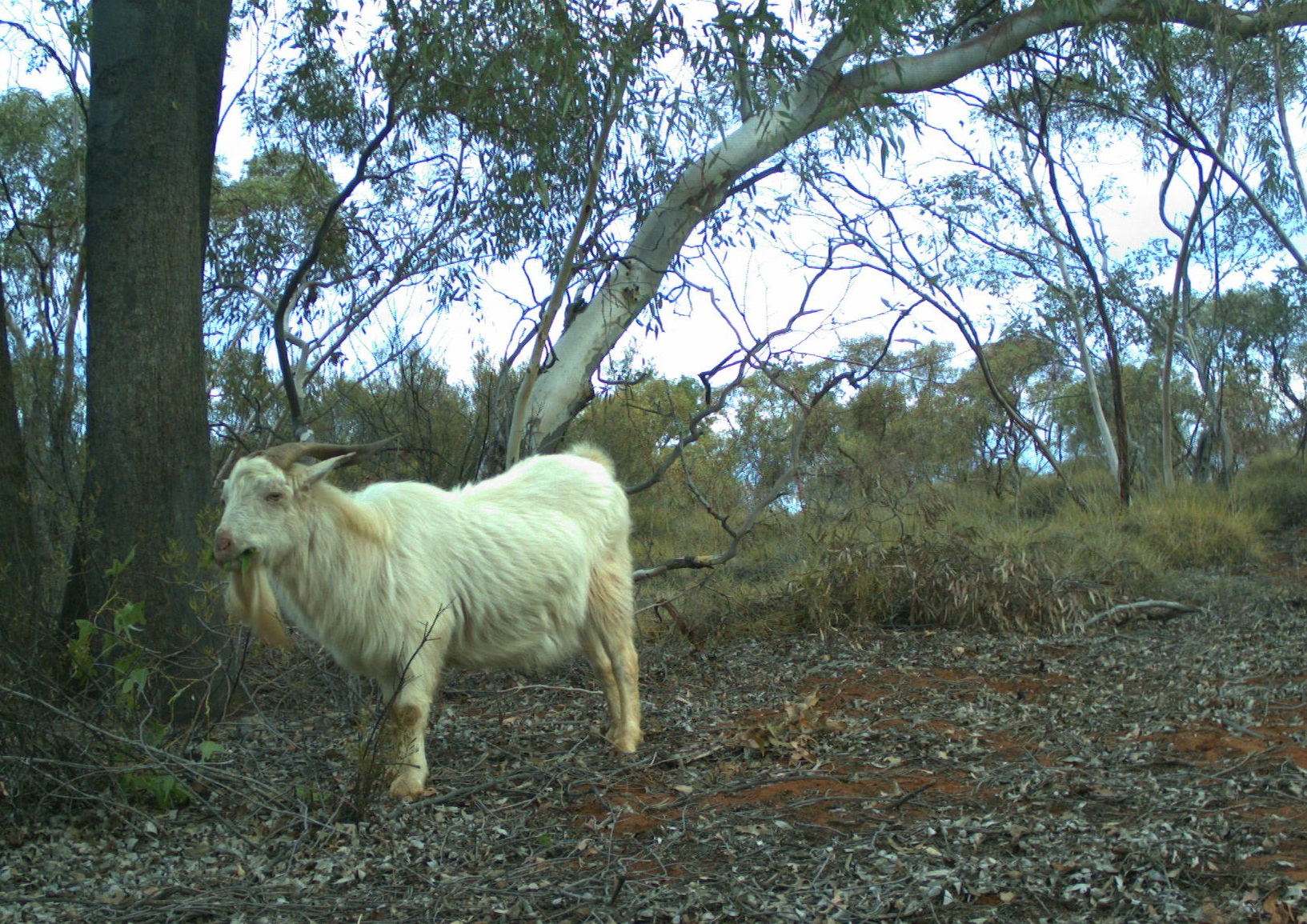
A feral goat at the Yathong Nature Reserve, 2018

Feral goats are found in all states and in the Australian Capital Territory but are rare in the Northern Territory. They are most prevalent in western New South Wales, which, in 2020, had a feral goat population estimated at 4.9 million. They are also at their highest densities in the arid and semi-arid rangelands, where they are considered a significant agricultural and environmental pest. People, through supplying water and controlling predators to improve sheep production, have modified the natural habitat favourably for feral goats.

Feral goats also occur on many Australian offshore islands. These include islands with important conservation values, such as Lord Howe Island, and islands in the Archipelago of the Recherche. Island populations are generally considered to be pests but the feral goats on North Goulburn Island provide a source of trophy animals for a safari operation run by the Aboriginal owners and also provide food for the owners while they visit the island. Feral goats have been eradicated from several islands including Faure Island, Bernier Island, Woody Island and Townshend Island. The establishment of new island populations is now less likely than in the past, especially in South Australia where the Animal and Plant Control Act 1986 prohibits the keeping and release of goats on nearly all islands in that state. The chance of natural colonisation of islands is remote as goats will swim (or even wade) only under dire need, but perhaps not impossible because goats have been reported to swim to obtain fresh water.

There were about 2.6 million feral goats in Australia in 1993 but this number has fluctuated widely. The fluctuations in number depends upon the quality of available food, availability of water, natural predation, hunting by people and deaths due to diseases, parasites and poisonous plants.

== Environmental impact ==
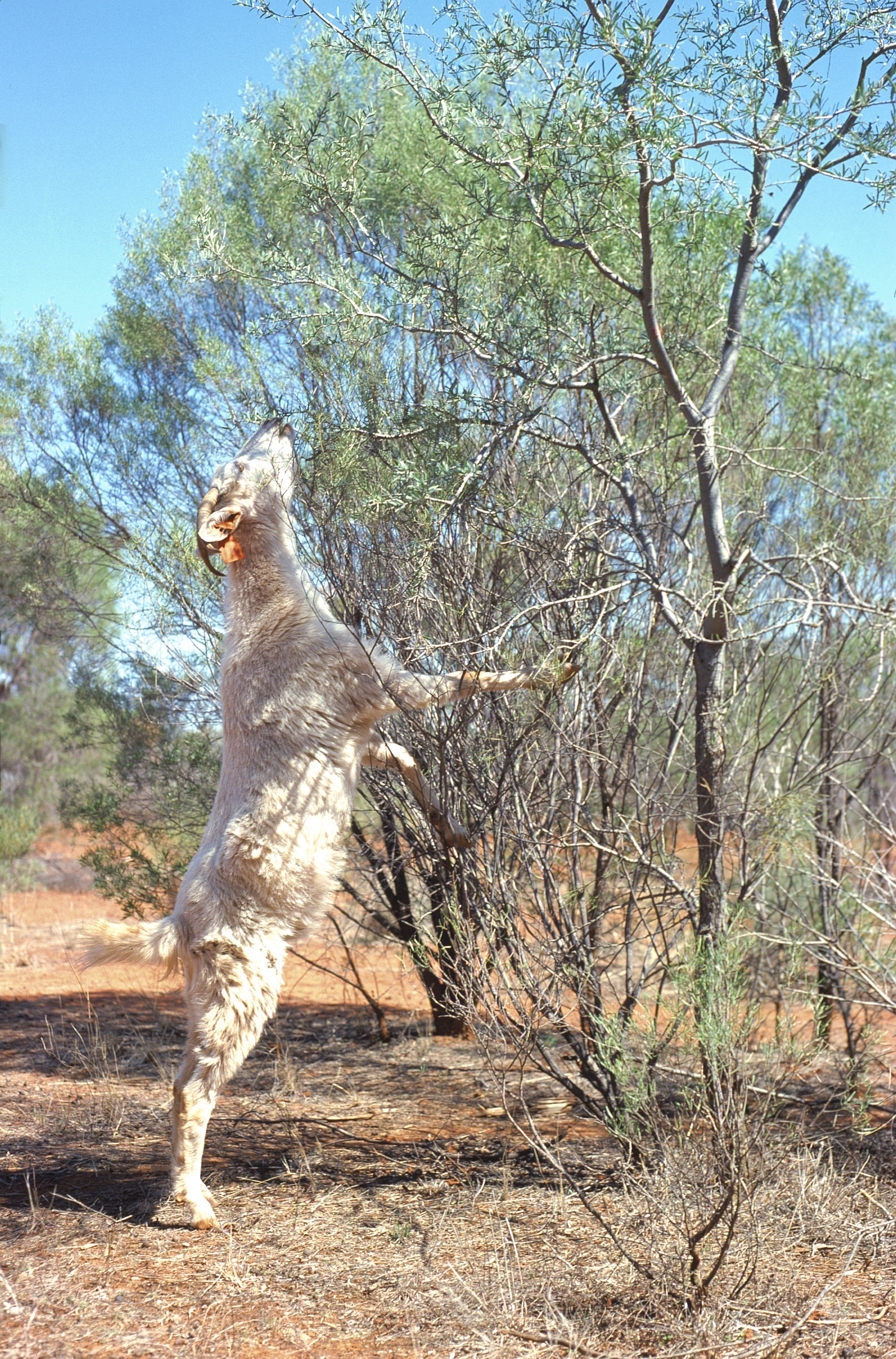
A feral goat in Coolabah, NSW, 1975

There are no documented examples of feral goats severely damaging large areas in absence of other herbivores, but they contribute their share of damage to the vegetation, soil and native fauna in areas of overgrazed pastoral land. Feral goats can deplete the soil's protective cover of vegetation and break up the soil crust with their hooves. This leads to wind erosion during droughts, water erosion during rain storms and can cause slips in steep areas. Increased erosion rates can have a significant long-term impact on biodiversity through the removal of soil and nutrients, and the alteration of soil structure leading to reduction in potential productivity. Feral goats may also affect perennial vegetation by feeding on established plants and by preventing the regeneration of seedlings. These goats, by browsing, can kill established plants by defoliation. They affect the regeneration processes indirectly when they reduce the ability of plants to produce seeds and directly when they eat young plants. Feral goats are particularly devastating to island ecosystems, causing direct and indirect impacts through overgrazing, which often results in ecosystem degradation and biodiversity loss.

Positive influences by goats and other introdued species upon the local ecosystem (as potential proxies to extinct Australian megafauna) are understudied. It has been found that the removal of feral goats leads to a decline in introduced annual grasses and an increase in native woody perennials and introduced fire-promoting perennial grasses. So, even though the initial impact of goats is often difficult to assess, elimination of goats may lead to increases in fire frequency and further invasion by introduced grasses.

=== Impact on native fauna ===
Feral goats affect the native terrestrial fauna of Australia by direct competition for resources such as food, water and shelter, and by contributing to changes in ecosystems. These impacts are usually undesirable because they reduce the biodiversity of the ecosystem. Feral goats compete with domestic livestock for food and water, although dietary overlap in some habitats may be high only when food is limiting. When it comes to water, feral goats can even exclude some animals aggressively. The goats can cause water levels in rock holes to be so lowered as to exclude other animals or cause animals to fall in, drown and consequently, pollute the supply. Goat dung can be deposited around waterholes and springs to a depth of several centimetres. Dung, along with the bodies of goats that fall in water and decompose, is likely to eutrophicate the water and have a major impact on the freshwater biota. Feral goats also compete with the native animals for shelter especially in rock caves. They have also found to eat some invertebrates such as gall-forming and scale insects. But whether this deliberate or incidental is unknown.

Goats are also considered a serious threat to yellow-footed rock-wallaby (Petrogale xanthopus) populations as there is considerable overlap in both species’ diet and habitat. Rock-wallaby numbers recovered after the 1983 drought in Gap Range, New South Wales where goats had been culled but concurrently failed to recover at the nearby Coturaundee Range, where goats were present in very high densities because they were not culled. Feral goats have been implicated in the decline of the brush-tailed rock-wallabies (Petrogale penicillata) in South Australia.

The additional grazing pressure that the feral goats apply has two consequences in relation to effects on other animals. Firstly, this will increase the amount of time when food is limiting. Secondly, goats have a more catholic diet than sheep, cattle and kangaroos, utilising many shrubs and trees that are unpalatable to these species. A broader ecological niche may allow goats to persist longer in droughts than their competitors and have a greater impact on their common food supply. In high numbers, and during drought, they may therefore significantly reduce the biomass of perennial vegetation, leading to further land degradation and hampering regeneration of vegetation. Goats are also a potential reservoir for a number of exotic diseases that could enter Australia, such as foot-and-mouth disease. Any attempt at eliminating a disease could therefore be frustrated by the difficulties and cost in controlling goats.

Feral goats have a more indirect impact on the native fauna as a result of their effects on the vegetation and soil. The changes to the vegetation harm some native animals, whereas benefit a few like the ones that feed on goat dung, such as termites and decomposers.

== Economic impact ==
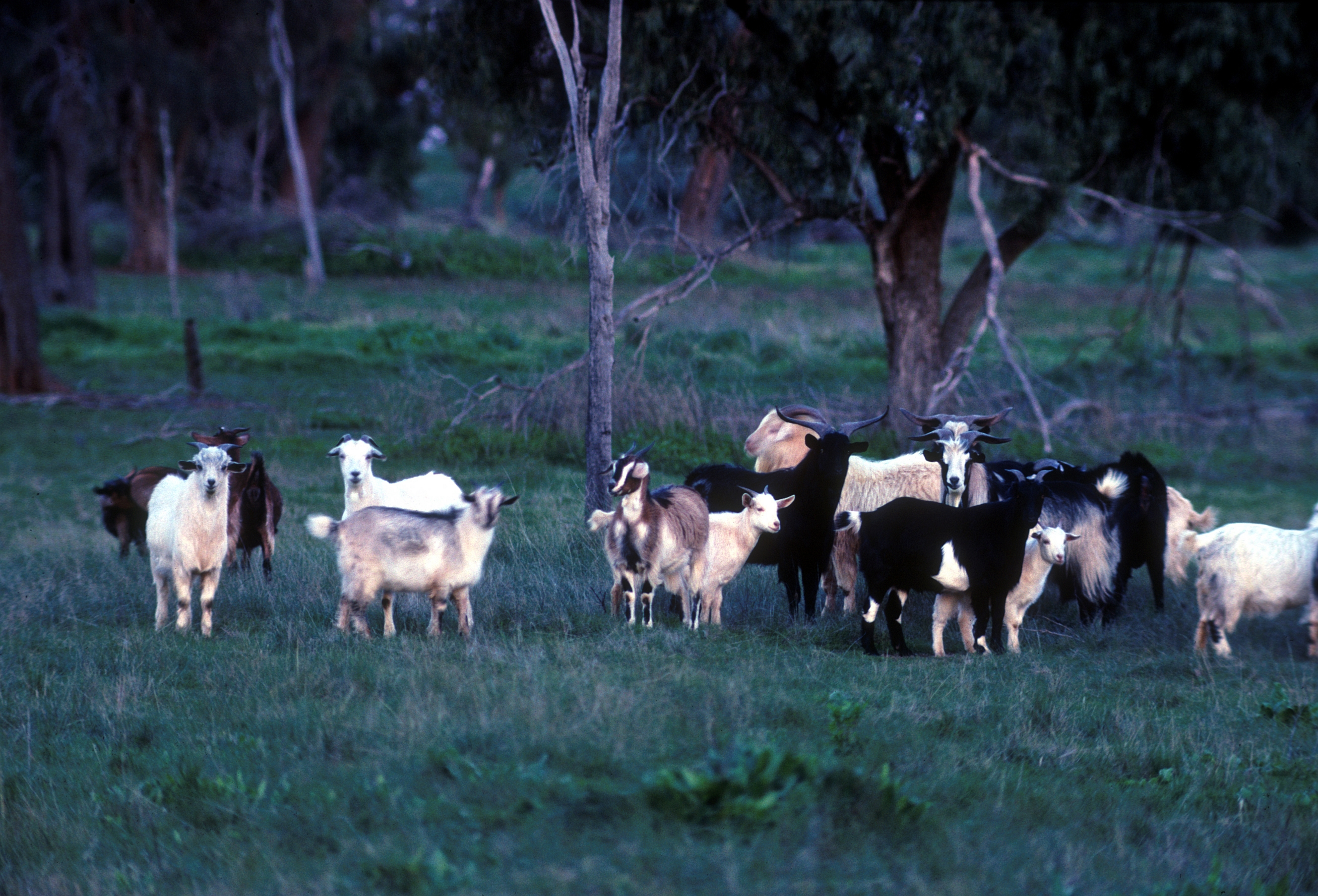
Feral goats in Yathong, 2003

Feral goats are responsible for an estimated loss of $25 million per year. These are derived from a calculated $17.8 million net loss due to reduced stock production, $6 million contingency loss due to the threat of exotic disease and $1.2 million spent by the government agencies on goat control operations. This estimate does not include the costs associated with the impact of feral goats on the environment, of soil erosion, or pastoral degradation.

Commercial exploitation of feral goats is a valuable industry. Many pastoralists in Australia now consider the capture and sale of feral goats to be an essential part of their business. Meat for export is the main product from feral goats. Some live feral goats are also exported. Goat skin is a by-product. Recently, feral goats have been crossed with the South African Boer goat to produce a heavier animal for export.

According to Meat & Livestock Australia, 2,364,307 goats were slaughtered in Australia in 2023. The bulk of them were feral rangeland goats, captured and gathered through goat depots, and then sent to an abattoir.

As of the early 2020s, Australia was responsible for only 0.4% of worldwide goat meat production, and its domestic market was small; only 9% of locally produced goat meat was consumed there. However, the country was also the world's largest exporter of the product: 35% of all of its exports, accounting for 44% of its global export value, or A$235 million. Most of Australia's goat meat exports were in the form of frozen whole carcasses. The country's biggest market for the product was the United States, with an average 60% volume share in the first half of the decade.

Feral goats are also used as a biological method of controlling weeds such as blackberry (Rubus fruticosus), briar (Rosa rubiginosa), serrated tussock (Nassella trichotoma), St John's wort (Hypericum perforatum) and thistles (family Asteraceae). They are particularly useful for controlling heavy weed infestations in difficult terrain. Goats have a preference for such weeds over other pasture species. Control of these weeds is usually expensive and herbicides are not appropriate in some environments.

== History ==
Feral goats came to Australia with the first fleet in 1788. For instance, cashmere goats were brought into South Australia in 1837. In the 1860s, angora goats and cashmere goats were imported from Asia in an order to start a goat fibre industry. Some herds were set free when the industry collapsed in the 1920s. Goats were also taken around Australia with settlers, railway construction groups and miners. The recent populations of the feral goat have established from goats used to control weeds in plantation forests and woody weeds in inland New South Wales and Queensland. The current feral goat populations in Australia represent a mixture of these origins.

== Management ==
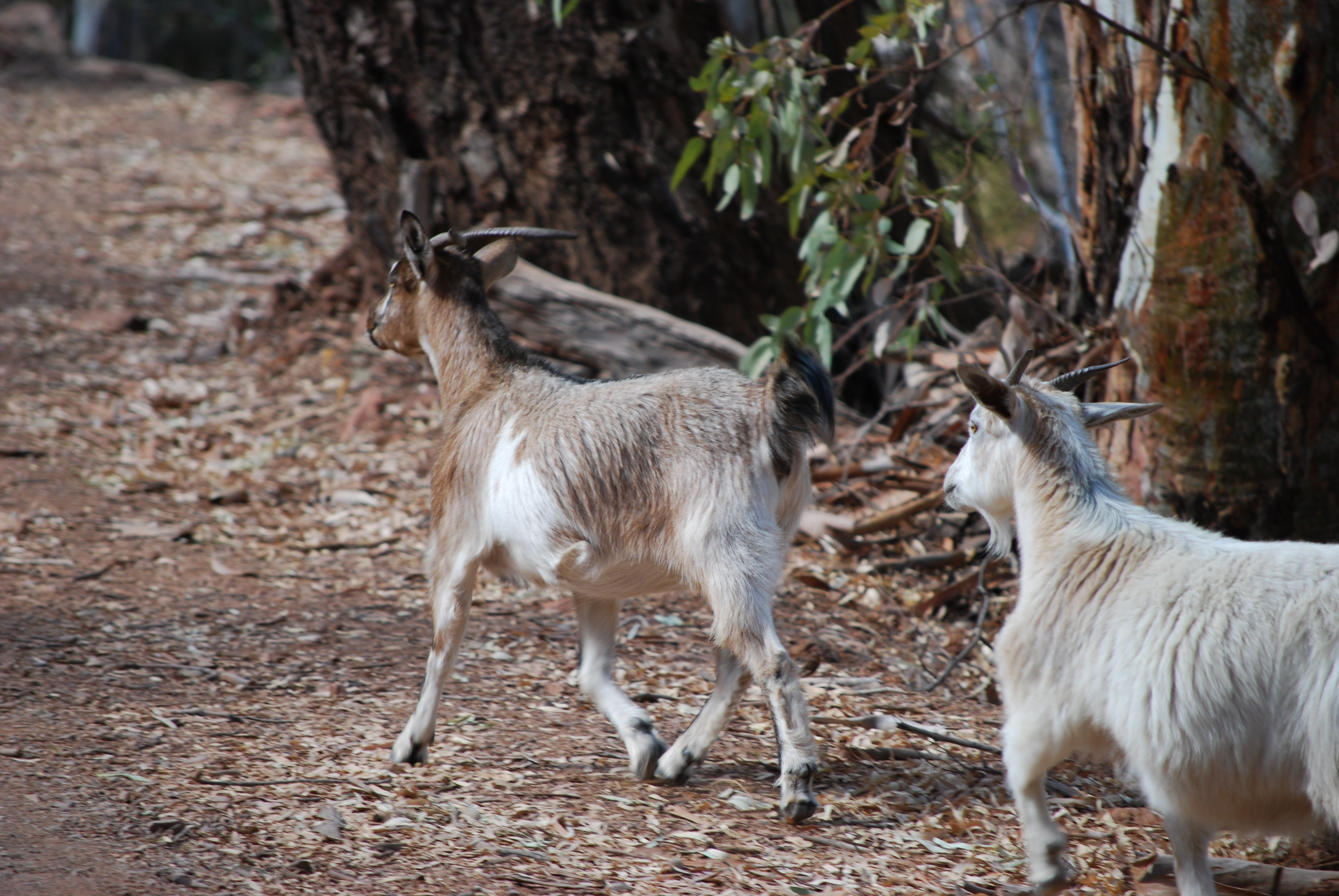
Feral goats in South Australia, 2008

Management of feral goats has varied depending on the balance between their pest and resource status, and their legal definition in different states. Feral goats are mostly viewed as pests by most land managers. This has led to campaigns to manage or eradicate them. Some laws prescribe how feral goats are to be managed, while others merely define them as pests and leave management to the discretion of land owners or public agencies. State and territory governments provide legislative, technical and possibly financial support for feral goat control, and are also responsible for feral goat management on land held by their agencies.

There is no current management policy for the control of feral goats in New South Wales. A group of pastoral and state agencies presented a proposal at the National workshop on Feral Goat Management. The proposal seeks to manage feral goats as part of a total grazing management program which aims to reduce the impact of goats on pastoral production and conservation values to insignificant levels. Goats are presently opportunistically mustered for slaughter. In New South Wales in 1996, feral goats occupied an estimated total area of 11,400 square kilometres in 101 conservation reserves. Sixty-seven of these were in the eastern, higher-rainfall areas of the State, where the impacts of feral goats have been little studies.

In Queensland, feral goats are declared pests under the Rural Lands Protection Act 1985. The widespread drought in Queensland has focused land managers' need to reduce total grazing pressure in the mulga lands. The Queensland Department of Environment and Heritage has an unwritten policy to eradicate goats from national parks, and has a program to do so from some offshore islands in cooperation with the Queensland Department of Lands.

Feral goats are managed by the Australian Capital Territory Parks and Conservation Service when they trespass on national parks and reserves. Feral goats are not declared pests in the Territory, so their management on private land is discretionary.

It is illegal to release goats into the wild in South Australia. Pastoral zone Soil Conservation Boards, with support from State and Commonwealth Government agencies, have embarked on a program to mitigate goat damage by promoting and coordinating goat control.

In the Northern Territory, goats are classified as stock under the Stock Diseases Act 1994 and the Territory has no general management policy for feral goats. Feral goats are not listed as pests in the Territory Parks and Wildlife Conservation Act 1988, but this classification is under review. The lack of definition has allowed people to introduce goats to areas previously free of goats, including islands.

Unowned goats in Tasmania are defined as feral under provisions of the Animal Health Bill and can be controlled if they present a stock disease problem. A survey by the Parks and Wildlife Service in 1991 led to the development of a feral goat threat abatement plan and an ongoing control campaign. By June 1995, 55 of the 136 populations located had been eradicated. Some management is done by recreational hunters and DELM has a feral goat control program on Crown land using the Judas goat technique and shooting from helicopters.

In Victoria, feral goats are declared as 'Established Pest Animals' under the Catchment and Land Protection Act 1994. All landowners (including the Crown) must take all reasonable steps to control them. Feral goat populations appear to be small and isolated in Victoria.

Goats are widely distributed in Western Australia, where they are regarded as a pest on rangelands. The Agriculture and Related Resources Protection Act 1976 sets out landowners' responsibilities to deal with them and to limit their spread. The principal driving force behind attempts to manage goats in the state is peer pressure among land managers. This results in community cooperation and coordination to manage goats, and legislation is only used as a means of last resort when all attempts to gain cooperation have failed. Western Australia has a feral goat management program covering most feral herds, and involves mustering goats for commercial sale to achieve the initial knockdown, followed by aerial and ground shooting to attempt to kill the remaining animals. The success of aerial shooting to control feral goats in arid and semi-arid environments has led to its widespread use in rugged and more densely vegetated terrain elsewhere in Australia.

Some pastoralists have also proposed establishing managed populations of feral goats for cashmere and meat production in the semiarid pastoral regions of Western Australia. Recent trials have shown that because of the high capital inputs required and low fibre yields, cashmere production in pastoral areas is not viable. In the Australian wild, feral goats have predators like dingoes, saltwater crocodiles, feral pigs, or wedge-tailed eagles that eat sick adults or kids.

== See also ==
- Invasive species in Australia
- Conservation in Australia
