= Panhole =

Depression or basin eroded into flat or gently sloping cohesive rock

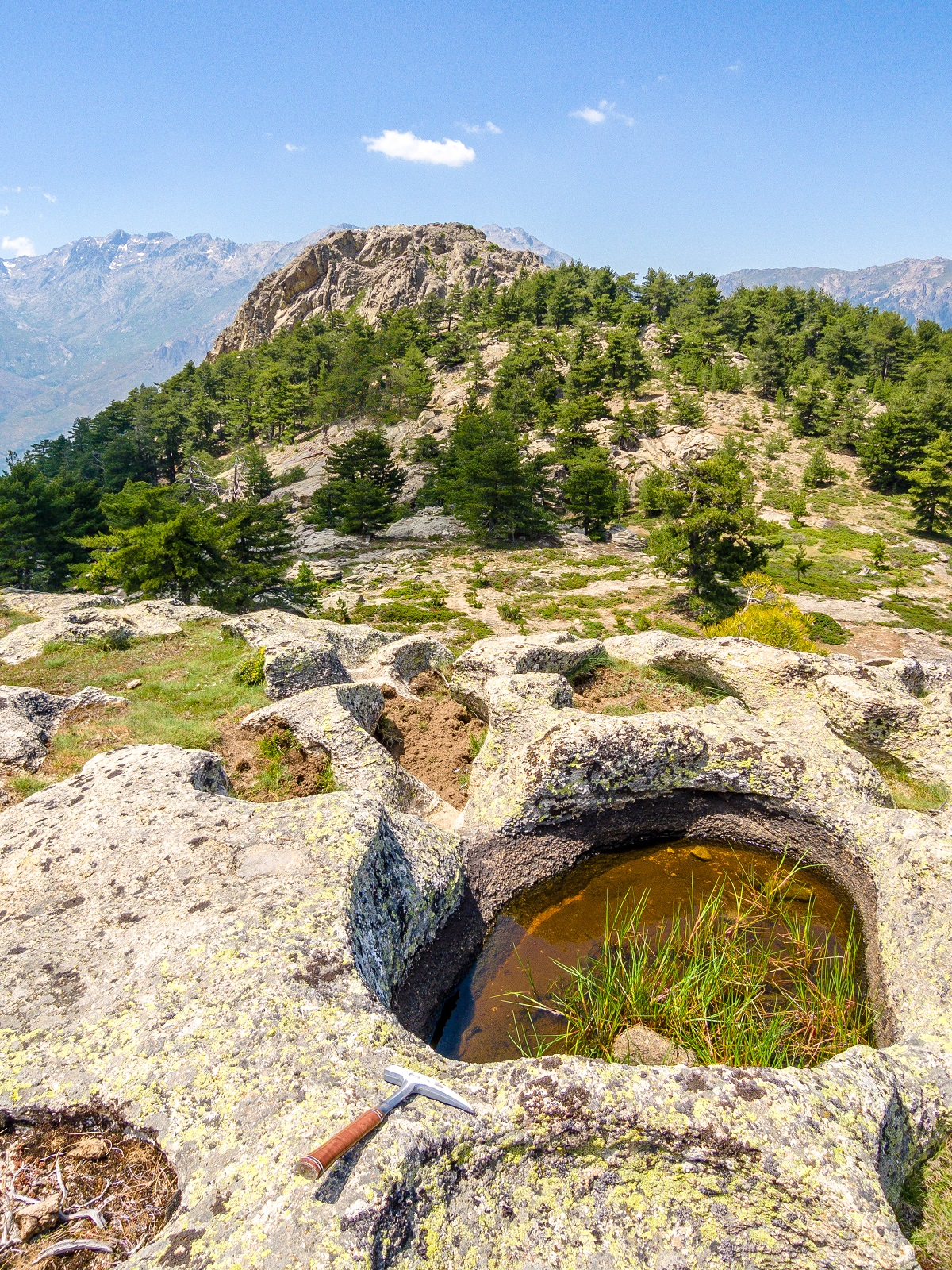
Panholes on a granite surface near Corscia, Corsica

A panhole is a depression or basin eroded into flat or gently sloping cohesive rock. Similar terms for this feature are gnamma or rock holes (Australia), armchair hollows, weathering pans (or pits) and solution pans (or pits).

Some authors refer to panholes also as potholes, which is a term typically used for similarly shaped riverine landforms. In fluvial geomorphology, the term pothole is typically used for a smooth, bowl-shaped or cylindrical hollow, generally deeper than wide, found developed in the rocky bed of a stream. This type of feature is created by the grinding action either of a stone or stones or of coarse sediment whirled around and kept in motion by eddies or the force of the stream current in a given spot.

== Description ==
Panholes are erosional or destructional features that are developed in a variety of climatic environments and in a wide range of rock types. These shallow basins, or closed depressions, are quite commonly well developed in surfaces of granitic rocks and sandstone. They are generally characterized by flat bottoms and sometimes by overhanging sides. The initial form may be a closed hollow created by a patch of humus. Diameters are rarely greater than 6 ft (1.8 m). Some panholes were at one time thought to be man-made because their roundness was so perfect they were argued not be natural and must have been shaped by humans.

Panholes are most commonly found in desert environments such as the Colorado Plateau. A few well-known panholes are found developed in sandstone surfaces in Canyonlands National Park, Capitol Reef National Park, and Moab. Panholes are capable of collecting water when it rains, freezing over when the weather gets cold, dry out in hotter weather, and can even contain some species of bacteria, lichens, mosses, and blue-green algae. Panholes range in size from a few centimeters to many meters in diameter. The cavities can be shallow or more than 15 meters (49 ft) deep, containing hundreds of liters of water.

The Australian Aboriginal term gnamma, in particular, implies a depression capable of holding water in arid areas, forming an important water resource for Aboriginal people that needed to be carefully maintained. Although initially formed naturally, gnammas used for water capture were maintained, and some enlarged, by Aboriginal people; others were used to trap lizards for food.

Within the panholes is a varied eco-system that contains bacteria such as cyanobacteria, fungi, and algae which can be referred to as biofilm. Diverse communities of invertebrates are also often present, with insect and crustacean filter-feeders contributing the majority of the eukaryote biomass. Panholes do not contain predators like fish, though smaller predators, such as aquatic insects are often present. The biofilm breaks down some of the siliceous minerals in the panhole for nutrients resulting in furthering the weathering the panhole. The organisms that live in the panholes have to tolerate rapid change in water temperature, pH, oxygen, carbon dioxide concentration, and ion concentration.

== Origin ==
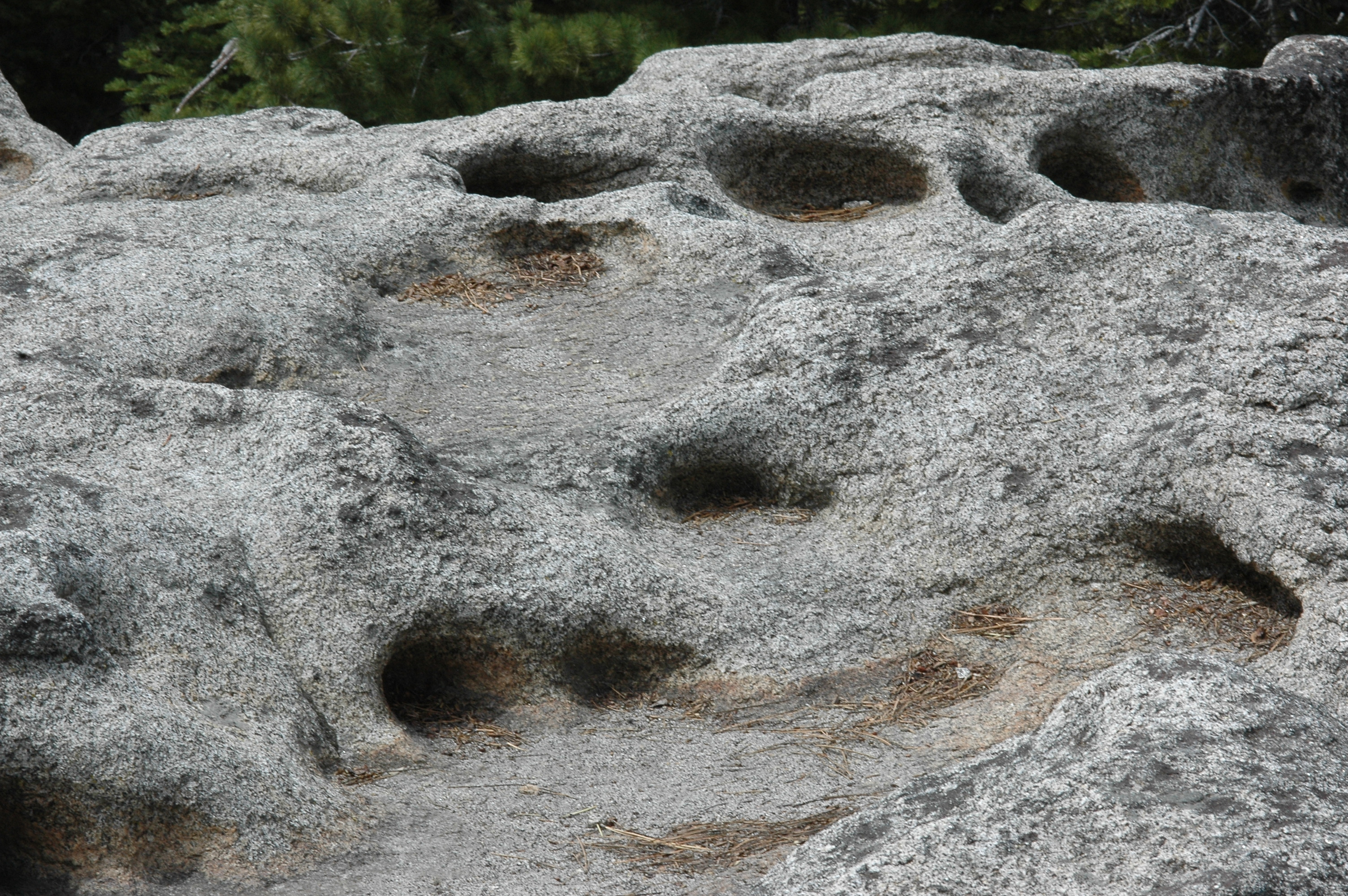
Panholes in granodiorite at Glacier Point, Yosemite National Park, California

In the Sierra Nevada, California these features were termed weathering pits by François E. Matthes, where they are thought to indicate rock surfaces that are unglaciated or escaped more recent glaciations. In Sierra Nevada granitic rocks, these features have a characteristic shape such that they expand more rapidly in width than they grow in depth. One explanation for their conformation is because the most active environment for weathering is the zone of alternate wetting and drying along the margins of the pools that collect in the pits, the margins tend to deepen and enlarge until all points of the bottom are equally wet or dry at the same time, thus producing their characteristic shape. Panholes can expand from weathering and erosion but the main activity of how panholes expand is from biological weathering. At one time the belief was that the only agents involved with the expansion of panholes were physical weathering.

== Terminology ==
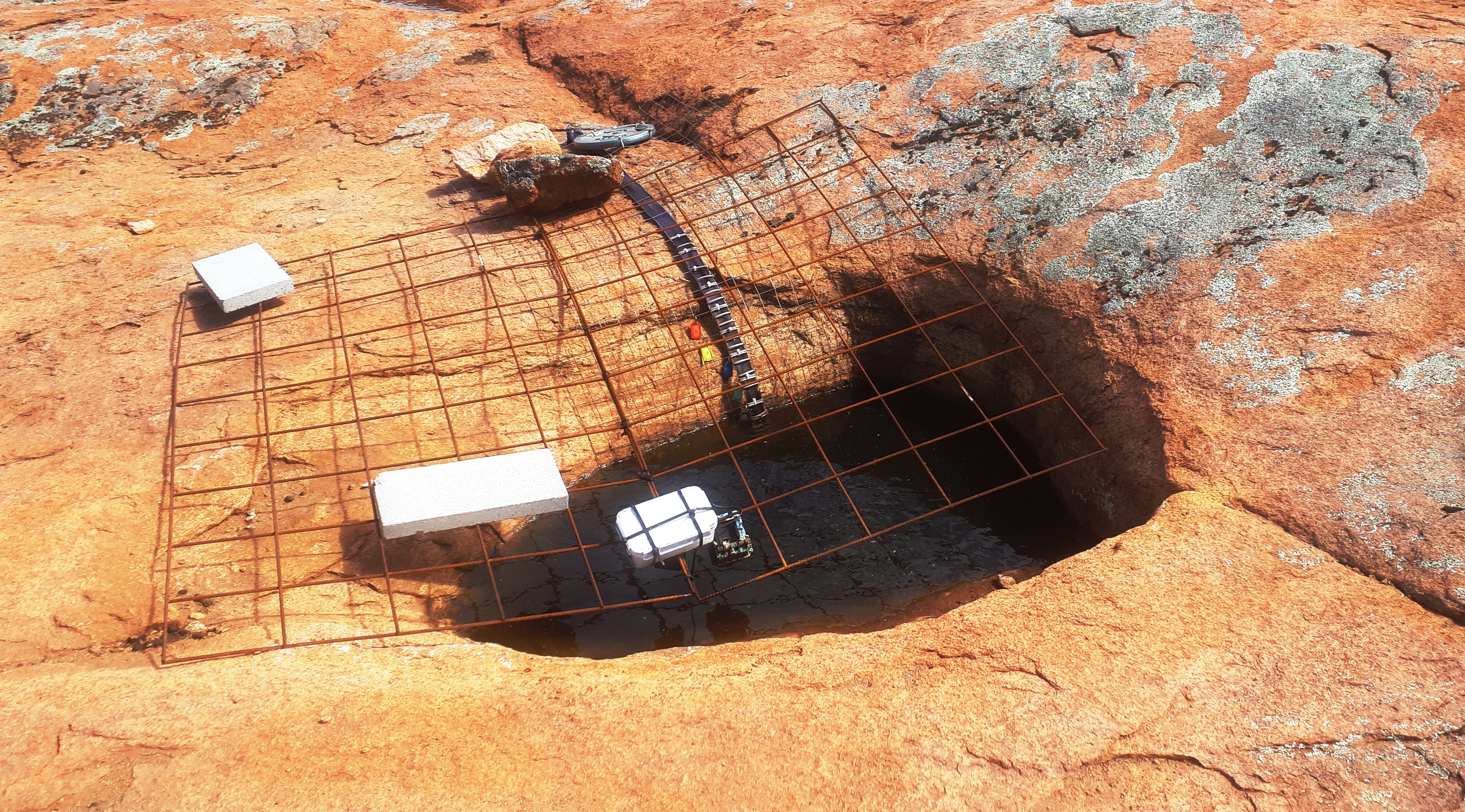
Rock hole in Hiltaba Nature Reserve, South Australia

=== Australia ===
In Australia, the terms "gnamma" and "rock hole" (or "rockhole") are used. Gnamma is an anglicization of a Nyoongar language word, used by the Aboriginal people of Western Australia to describe a naturally formed rock hole as well as its retained rainwater. The term "gnamma hole" is also widely used, but is incorrect, being a tautology.

== Locations ==
=== Australia ===
- Eyre Peninsula South Australia
- Fraser Range, Western Australia
- Hiltaba Nature Reserve, South Australia

=== United States ===
- Beam Rocks, Forbes State Forest, Pennsylvania
- Canyonlands National Park, Utah
- Glacier Point, Yosemite National Park, California
- Navajo National Monument, Arizona
- Shenandoah National Park, Virginia
- Stone Mountain, Georgia
- Stone Mountain (North Carolina), North Carolina
