= List of cities and towns in South Australia =

This is a list of town and locality names in South Australia outside the metropolitan postal area of Adelaide.

For a list of suburbs in metropolitan areas of Adelaide, see lists inside following individual city council articles: City of Adelaide, City of Burnside, City of Campbelltown, City of Charles Sturt, Town of Gawler, City of Holdfast Bay, City of Marion, City of Mitcham, City of Norwood Payneham St Peters, City of Onkaparinga, City of Playford, City of Port Adelaide Enfield, City of Prospect, City of Salisbury, City of Tea Tree Gully, City of Unley, City of West Torrens and Town of Walkerville

See also List of South Australian place names changed from German names

== Distinction between cities and towns ==
Depending on the criteria used, South Australia contains between eight and ten distinct cities (excluding LGAs, which are often termed "City of…" irrespective of the area's administrative status). Cities typically possess a level of infrastructure, as well as population size and/or density, that distinguish them from smaller towns or settlements (such as Ceduna and Coober Pedy). Notwithstanding this, a city must be formally proclaimed as such by the state government in order to hold the requisite legislative standing.

In some cases, a large town may remain unincorporated – even where its population surpasses that of formally designated cities – until such a time as it is absorbed by an existing city; commonly via urban sprawl.

The eight legally recognised cities within SA, separately proclaimed between 1840 and 2000, are as follows:

- Adelaide (est. 1840);
- Port Pirie (est. 1953);
- Mount Gambier (est. 1954);
- Whyalla (est. 1961);
- Port Augusta (est. 1963);
- Port Lincoln (est. 1971);
- Murray Bridge (est. 1993);
- Victor Harbor (est. 2000).

Two further large towns are unofficially regarded as cities:

- Mount Barker (2026 population estimate of 47,584 – larger than all official cities except Greater Adelaide); often referred to as a "major regional city".
- Gawler (2026 population estimate of 28,196 – roughly equivalent to Mount Gambier and larger than six other cities); described by the South Australian Government as the "regional city of Gawler".

Other towns are listed under the alphabetised categories below.

== A ==
- Adelaide
- Agery
- Alawoona
- Alford
- Aldgate
- Allendale East
- American River
- Andamooka
- Andrews
- Angaston
- Angle Vale
- Appila
- Ardrossan
- Armagh
- Arno Bay
- Arthurton
- Auburn
- Avenue Range

== B ==
- Bagot Well
- Baird Bay
- Balaklava
- Balgowan
- Balhannah
- Barmera
- Barabba
- Beachport
- Beltana
- Berri
- Bethany
- Binnum
- Birdwood
- Black Hill
- Black Point
- Blakiston
- Blanche Harbor
- Blanchetown
- Blinman
- Blyth
- Booborowie
- Booleroo Centre
- Bordertown
- Borrika
- Border Village
- Boston
- Bower
- Bowhill
- Bowmans
- Bridgewater
- Brentwood
- Brinkworth
- Bruce
- Brukunga
- Buckleboo
- Burra
- Burrungule
- Bute
- Butler

== C ==
- Cadell
- Calca
- Callington
- Calomba
- Caloote
- Calperum Station
- Cultana
- Caltowie
- Cambrai
- Cape Jervis
- Carpenter Rocks
- Carrickalinga
- Carrieton
- Ceduna
- Charleston
- Cherry Gardens
- Cherryville
- Chowilla
- Clare
- Clarendon
- Clayton Bay
- Cleve
- Clinton
- Cobdogla
- Cockaleechie
- Cockatoo Valley
- Cockburn
- Coffin Bay
- Commissariat Point
- Coober Pedy
- Coobowie
- Cook
- Cooke Plains
- Cooltong
- Coomandook
- Coonalpyn
- Coonawarra
- Coorabie
- Copeville
- Copley
- Corny Point
- Coulta
- Cowell
- Cradock
- Crystal Brook
- Cudlee Creek
- Culburra
- Cummins
- Cungena
- Curramulka
- Currency Creek

== D ==
- Danggali
- Darke Peak
- Davenport
- Dawesley
- Delamere
- Donovans
- Dowlingville
- Dublin
- Dutton

== E ==
- Eden Valley
- Ediacara
- Edillilie
- Edithburgh
- Elliston
- Encounter Bay
- Ernabella
- Eudunda

== F ==
- Farrell Flat
- False Bay
- Felixstow
- Finniss
- Forreston
- Foul Bay
- Fowlers Bay
- Frances
- Freeling
- Fregon
- Furner
- Farina

== G ==
- Galga
- Gawler
- Georgetown
- Geranium
- Giles Corner
- Gladstone
- Glencoe
- Glendambo
- Gluepot
- Goolwa
- Grange
- Greenock
- Greenways
- Gulnare
- Gumeracha

== H ==
- Hahndorf
- Halbury
- Halidon
- Hallett
- Hallett Cove
- Hamilton
- Hamley Bridge
- Hammond
- Harrogate
- Hartley
- Haslam
- Hatherleigh
- Hawker
- Hayborough
- Head of the Bight
- Henley Beach
- Hill River
- Hilltown
- Hincks
- Honiton
- Hoyleton
- Hynam

== I ==
- Innamincka
- Inman Valley
- Inneston
- Iron Baron
- Iron Knob
- Island Beach

== J ==
- Jabuk
- Jamestown
- James Well
- Jervois

== K ==
- Kadina
- Kainton
- Kalangadoo
- Kanmantoo
- Kapunda
- Karkoo
- Karoonda
- Keith
- Kersbrook
- Keyneton
- Ki Ki
- Kielpa
- Kimba
- Kingoonya
- Kingscote
- Kingston SE
- Kingston-On-Murray
- Kongorong
- Koolunga
- Koppio
- Korunye
- Krondorf
- Kunytjanu
- Kyancutta
- Kybybolite

== L ==
- Lightsview
- Lake View
- Lameroo
- Langhorne Creek
- Laura
- Leigh Creek
- Lenswood
- Lewiston
- Linwood
- Light Pass
- Lipson
- Littlehampton
- Lobethal
- Lochiel
- Lock
- Long Plains
- Longwood
- Louth Bay
- Loveday
- Lower Light
- Loxton
- Loxton North
- Lucindale
- Lyndhurst
- Lyndoch
- Lyrup

== M ==
- Macclesfield
- Maitland
- Mallala
- Mambray Creek
- Manna Hill
- Mannum
- Manoora
- Mantung
- Marama
- Marananga
- Marion Bay
- Marla
- Marrabel
- Marree
- McCracken
- Meadows
- Melrose
- Meningie
- Mercunda
- Merriton
- Middleback Range
- Middle Beach
- Middleton
- Mil Lel
- Milang
- Millicent
- Mindarie
- Minlaton
- Minnipa
- Mintabie
- Mintaro
- Miranda
- Moana
- Moculta
- Monarto South
- Monash
- Moonta
- Moorak
- Moorlands
- Moorook
- Morchard
- Morgan
- Mount Barker
- Mount Bryan
- Mount Burr
- Mount Compass
- Mount Gambier
- Mount Pleasant
- Mount Torrens
- Mullaquana
- Mundallio
- Mundoora
- Murdinga
- Murray Bridge
- Murray Bridge East
- Murray Bridge South
- Murray Town
- Mylor
- Mypolonga
- Myponga

== N ==
- Nackara
- Nain
- Nairne
- Nangwarry
- Nantawarra
- Naracoorte
- Narrung
- New Well
- Nildottie
- Ninnes
- Noarlunga
- Nonning
- Normanville
- Northgate
- Norton Summit
- Nullarbor
- Nundroo
- Nuriootpa

== O ==
- OB Flat
- Oakbank
- Olary
- Olympic Dam
- Oodnadatta
- Orroroo
- Owen
- Overland Corner

== P ==
- Padthaway
- Palmer
- Parachilna
- Paratoo
- Parham
- Parilla
- Paringa
- Parndana
- Parrakie
- Paruna
- Paskeville
- Peake
- Peebinga
- Penneshaw
- Penola
- Penrice
- Penwortham
- Perlubie
- Perponda
- Peterborough
- Piccadilly
- Pine Point
- Pinkerton Plains
- Pinnaroo
- Point Boston
- Point Lowly
- Point Mcleay
- Point Pass
- Point Pearce
- Point Souttar
- Point Sturt
- Point Turton
- Polda
- Poochera
- Port Arthur
- Port Augusta
- Port Augusta North
- Port Augusta West
- Port Broughton
- Port Elliot
- Port Flinders
- Port Gawler
- Port Germein
- Port Hughes
- Port Julia
- Port Kenny
- Port Lincoln
- Port MacDonnell
- Port Neill
- Port Paterson
- Port Pirie
- Port Pirie South
- Port Pirie West
- Port Victoria
- Port Vincent
- Port Wakefield
- Port Willunga
- Price
- Proof Range
- Punyelroo

== Q ==
- Quorn
- Qualco

== R ==
- Ramco
- Rapid Bay
- Raukkan
- Redbanks
- Redhill
- Reeves Plains
- Rendelsham
- Renmark
- Renmark South
- Riverton
- Risdon Park
- Risdon Park South
- Riverton
- Robe
- Robertstown
- Rogues Point
- Roseworthy
- Rowland Flat
- Roxby Downs
- Rudall

== S ==
- Saddleworth
- Saltia
- Sandalwood
- Sanderston
- Sandilands
- Sandy Creek
- Sapphiretown
- Sceale Bay
- Seacliff
- Seacombe Heights
- Seaford
- Second Valley
- Secret Rocks
- Sedan
- Semaphore
- Semaphore South
- Seppeltsfield
- Shea-Oak Log
- Sherlock
- Smoky Bay
- Snowtown
- Solomontown
- South Kilkerran
- Southend
- Spalding
- Springton
- Stanley Flat
- Stansbury
- Stenhouse Bay
- Stirling
- Stirling North
- Stockport
- Stockwell
- Stone Hut
- Stone Well
- Strathalbyn
- Streaky Bay
- Sultana Point
- Summertown
- Sutherlands
- Swan Reach

== T ==
- Tailem Bend
- Taldra
- Tantanoola
- Tanunda
- Taplan
- Tarcoola
- Tarcowie
- Tarlee
- Tarpeena
- Taylorville Station
- Templers
- Terowie
- Thevenard
- Thompson Beach
- Tickera
- Tiddy Widdy Beach
- Tintinara
- Tirulla
- Tooligie
- Totness
- Trihi
- Truro
- Tumby Bay
- Tungkillo
- Two Wells

== U ==
- Uleybury
- Ungarra
- Upper Sturt
- Uraidla

== V ==
- Veitch
- Venus Bay
- Verdun
- Victor Harbor
- Virginia

== W ==
- Waikerie
- Wallaroo
- Wami Kata
- Wanbi
- Wangary
- Wanilla
- Warnertown
- Warooka
- Warrachie
- Warramboo
- Warrow
- Wasleys
- Watervale
- Waukaringa
- Webb Beach
- Weetulta
- Wellington
- Wharminda
- Whites Flat
- Whyalla
- Whyalla Barson
- Whyalla Jenkins
- Whyalla Norrie
- Whyalla Playford
- Whyalla Stuart
- Whyte Yarcowie
- Williamstown
- Willunga
- Wilmington
- Windsor
- Winkie
- Winninowie
- Wirrabara
- Wirrulla
- Wistow
- Witchelina
- Wolseley
- Woodside
- Wool Bay
- Woolundunga
- Woomera
- Wudinna
- Wynarka

== Y ==
- Yacka
- Yahl
- Yalata
- Yallunda Flat
- Yaninee
- Yankalilla
- Yeelanna
- Yellabinna
- Yongala
- Yorketown
- Younghusband
- Yumali
- Yunta
