= Eyre Peninsula bushfire, 2005 =

2005 bushfire in South Australia

Eyre Peninsula "Black Tuesday" (or Wangary) bushfire, 2005
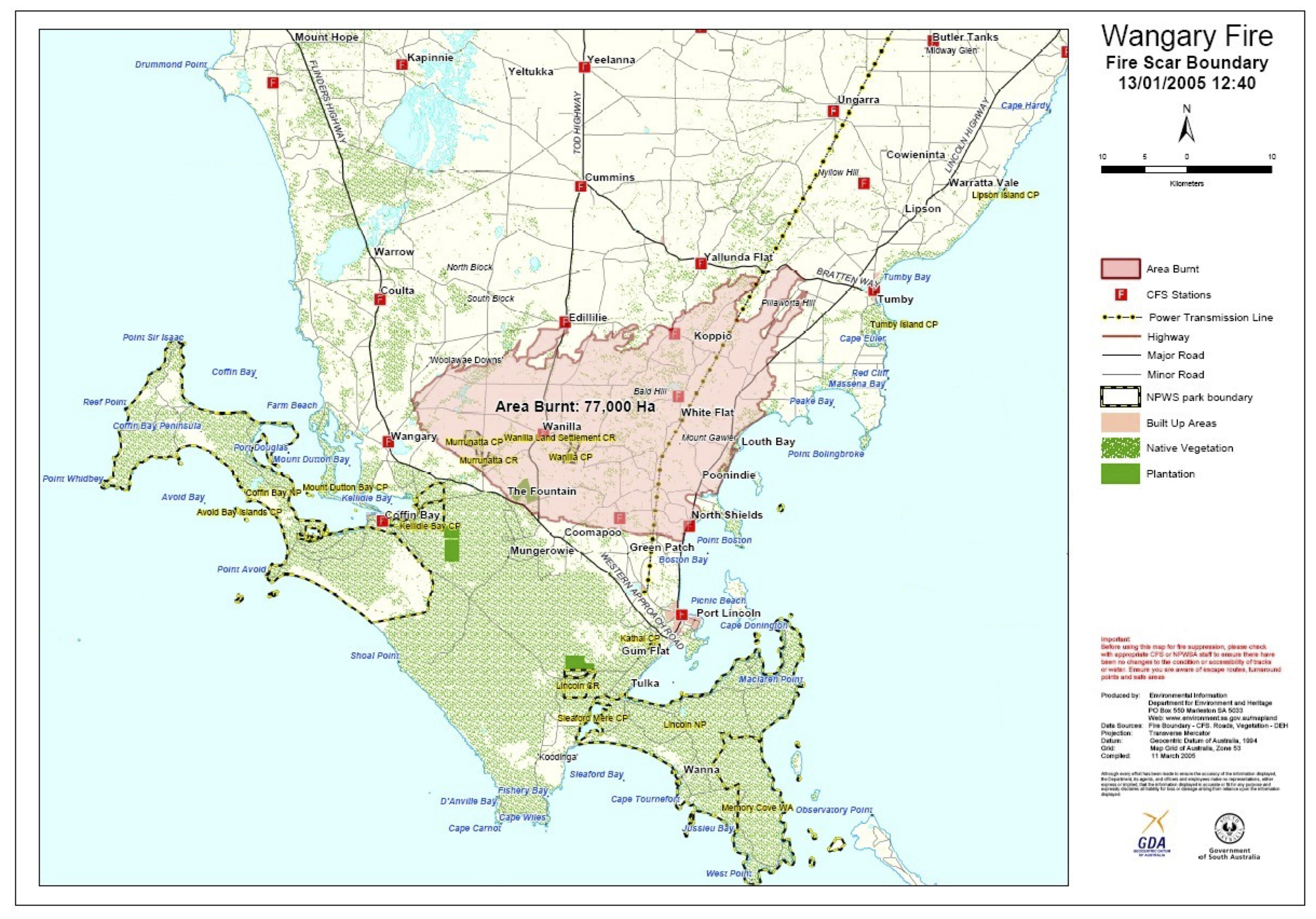
- The fire scour boundary as of 13 January 2005 (pink area: the fire spread 40 kilometres (25 mi) eastwards from the point of ignition)
- Date: 10 January 2005 – 20 January 2005
- Location: Lower Eyre Peninsula, South Australia, Australia
- Coordinates: 34°26′55″S 135°52′35″E

Statistics (Note: The findings of the coronial inquest were handed down on 18 December 2007. Some modifications were incorporated into the report in February 2008 and it is this later version that is cited in this article.)
- Burned area: 77,964 hectares (192,650 acres)
- Land use: Farming (wheat, sheep) and residential

Impacts
- Deaths: 9
- Injuries: 115
- Structures destroyed: 93 houses; 316 farm sheds (destroyed or significantly damaged)

Ignition
- Cause: Hot vehicle exhaust particle(s) ignited dry vegetation at roadside

Map
- Location in South Australia

The Eyre Peninsula bushfire of 2005, an event also known locally as Black Tuesday and by South Australian Government agencies as the Wangary bushfire, was a bushfire that occurred during January 2005 on the lower part of the Eyre Peninsula, a significant part of South Australia's wheat belt, where most of the land is either cropped or grazed. The fire resulted in 780 square kilometres (301 sq mi) of land being burnt, the loss of nine lives, injury to another 115 people, and huge property damage. It was South Australia's worst bushfire since the Ash Wednesday fires of 1983. Heat from the fire reached 1,000 °C (1,830 °F), with speeds up to 100 kilometres per hour (62 mph).

== Ignition: Monday 10 January 2005 ==
Maximum temperatures were recorded on 10 January 2005 as 31.9 °C (89.4 °F) at Coles Point and 38.6 °C (101.5 °F) at Port Lincoln; winds gusted to 63 kilometres per hour (39 mph). The bushfire began not long after 3 pm in roadside vegetation on Lady Franklyn Road north of the town of Wangary, approximately 45 kilometres (28 mi) north-west of Port Lincoln. The source of ignition was subsequently found to have been a vehicle parked in grass on the roadside. The inquest conducted by the Deputy State Coroner concluded that "a carbonaceous particle or particles landed in dry vegetation at the side of Lady Franklyn Road and immediately, or virtually immediately, ignited that vegetation" from an exhaust system that "had a number of irregularities and defects that consisted of holes and imperfect joins in the system. [The] muffler was not a standard part for that vehicle. Compared to the standard muffler that would normally be fitted to a vehicle of that type, the non-standard after-market muffler had a lesser capacity to inhibit the passage of hot carbonaceous particles through it."

After the fire was detected, people went to the scene, including farmers in their farm firefighting appliances who had seen the smoke from a distance. Country Fire Service (CFS) appliances and their volunteer crews were also dispatched to the location. It quickly became obvious that sourcing water in this area was a problem; the fire proved difficult to quell under the influence of a strong breeze. Valiant efforts were made to contain the fire during the course of the afternoon, and more CFS appliances arrived. By the evening, the fireground covered 1,800 hectares (4,400 acres) with a south-eastern flank of several kilometres.

Measures to counter the fire included fire suppression, blacking out, burning out, backburning, and earthmoving. At 8:54 pm, when the unfavourable weather conditions for firefighting had abated, the fire was judged to be contained. (This carried no implication that the fire was extinguished; the fire was still active in an area of sugar gums and in a swamp.)

== Tragedies: Tuesday 11 January 2005 ==
Overnight, the fire edge extended approximately 7 kilometres (4.3 mi). The weather forecast for the morning of Tuesday 11 January was very unfavourable for firefighting, suggesting that extreme conditions would exist at 10 am. In the event, just before 10 am the first of several breakouts occurred from the fireground, spreading extremely quickly under strong north-westerly winds.

Maximum temperatures on Tuesday 11 January were recorded as 36.7 °C (98.1 °F) at Coles Point and 38.2 °C (100.8 °F) at Port Lincoln; winds gusted to 83 kilometres per hour (52 mph).

During the course of the morning and early afternoon, fire proceeded across the landscape of the Lower Eyre Peninsula in an easterly direction, carried in the main by wheat-stubble fuels. Ultimately it reached North Shields and its beachside caravan park on the east coast 8 kilometres (5 mi) north of Port Lincoln's suburbs, and the Port Lincoln Airport and adjacent settlement of Poonindie a further 5 kilometres (3 mi) northwards. The worst affected areas were Wangary, North Shields, Wanilla, Poonindie, Louth Bay, Whites Flat, Koppio, Greenpatch and Warunda. Essential services such as electricity, telecommunications and water infrastructure were destroyed.

The flames "chose their victims at random", according to an Australian Broadcasting Corporation reporter who interviewed victims on Wednesday 12 January. "Half the Port Lincoln Caravan Park at North Shields was spared; the other half, destroyed. As the flames bore down on the caravan park, panicked residents escaped to the ocean." One man, who had escaped to the beach, said "It's the worst place for it to come, actually, because there's nowhere to run. That's why a lot of the people here ended up in the water. I rescued a man out of a boat that got washed out to sea with the wind yesterday. They jumped off the cliffs when the fire came. [A neighbour and his daughter] couldn't see the land because of the smoke, and the wind was that strong, it actually pushed them out to sea and they nearly drowned, and some people came along in boats and picked them up, and they ended up on the shore just up the road here, and he was collapsed on the bottom of the boat. He spent the night in hospital."

During the Tuesday, the fire claimed the lives of nine people and injured 115, three of whom required urgent hospital treatment in Adelaide. The coronial inquest recorded that the fire caused approximately $100 million in total property damage, including: (Note: Some of the sources referenced in this article conflict with each other in relation to statistics and some other details. The article therefore uses information from the most authoritative of the sources, namely the report of the coronial inquest published in December 2007, as updated in February 2008.)

- 77,964 hectares (193,000 acres; 780 km^{2}; 301 sq mi) of land burnt
- 93 houses destroyed or significantly damaged
- 316 sheds destroyed or significantly damaged
- 45 vehicles destroyed
- 139 farm machines destroyed
- 6,300 kilometres (3,900 mi) of fencing destroyed
- 47,000 stock losses
- 135 commercial properties affected
- 100 small holdings affected
- $4.6 million damage to SA Water pipelines and infrastructure
- $1.07 million damage to the Transport SA road network
- $465,000 damage to Telstra [telecommunications] infrastructure
- $245,000 damage to electricity infrastructure
- $100,000 damage to conservation parks.

It was not until 20 January before firefighters finished attending to continuing hazards such as smouldering logs and fenceposts and the fire was finally declared extinguished.

== Relief and recovery ==
The human impact of loss, injury and dislocation, and the loss of treasured possessions and clothing, was immense. As the fire continued its spread across the peninsula, residents provided emergency accommodation and assistance for fire victims at several assembly points. A bushfire recovery centre was set up at Port Lincoln High School and Cummins Bowling Club. The State Recovery Committee, comprising representatives of government agencies and relief organisations, met urgently on 12 January to coordinate prompt agency responses. Personal hardship and distress grants were provided as a priority, including a State Government grant of $10,000 to all farmers affected by the fire to assist with immediate needs; Centrelink payments were prioritised; a hotline service was set up on 12 January, receiving more than 2900 calls in 15 weeks; and extensive measures such as providing shipping containers for storage of salvaged possession were speedily put in place.

Donations of goods flooded in, and an Army detachment and people from across Australia joined local people to help with the clean-up – discovering among the devastation such objects as melted headlight glass and aluminium – and undertaking recovery tasks such as re-fencing.

Ten years later, on Sunday 11 January 2015, about 200 people packed into the Marble Range Football Club, Wangary, for a 10th anniversary memorial service. State member of parliament for the region, Peter Treloar, who in 2005 was a farmer, said "Many people's lives changed for ever that day"; but he said he understood that not all wanted to be involved in the commemoration. "It's not going to be a day for everyone. I've spoken to some people who did not want to attend." Memorial organiser Benji Callen said people were still healing from the bushfire and attended the memorial with mixed feelings. Among people who had been in the fire who spoke with reporters from the Australian Broadcasting Corporation was Lorna Harding, aged 91, who was among those who took refuge in the sea off North Shields. She had watched as the house she was born in and had lived in all her life was destroyed. "It just came so fast. Before we knew where we were, we were covered in smoke. But we had the sea to go into so we were right."

== Coronial inquest ==
Between 5 October 2005 and 8 May 2007, South Australia's Deputy State Coroner conducted a coronial inquest that examined a large range of factors connected with the bushfire, taking evidence from 140 witnesses. In his 703-page report released on 18 December 2007, the coroner made 34 wide-ranging recommendations for minimising future bushfire risks, to which the South Australian Government subsequently responded. The report also listed other investigations into the bushfire.

An Australian Broadcasting Corporation television program broadcast on the day on which the coronial findings were released stated that "The report details a series of miscalculations and miscommunications among firefighters on the ground and their CFS senior officers in Adelaide that resulted in resources being denied until the fire was out of control. According to the Deputy Coroner, miscommunications between senior CFS officers left them unaware how seriously the fire was growing. As a result, critical decisions were delayed. ... There are those critical of the coronial process, arguing it does little to prevent a future bushfire ... civil action is likely to be launched immediately against the CFS and the owner of the vehicle which started the fire by 70 litigants, mostly farmers."

A great deal of evidence was given to the inquest about the crucial question of the firefighting and fire suppression strategies that could and/or should have been adopted on the Monday night and the Tuesday morning, but were not. The main focus of activity overnight, attracting much of the available resources, had been on an area of sugar gum trees. The coroner considered it was an unwanted distraction to CFS appliances that might otherwise have been available to work elsewhere. Only a very limited amount of suppression work was undertaken on the eastern or western sides of a paperbark swamp, or in the swamp, where there was significant fire activity. As a result, fire was able to escape from that part of the swamp with no resources there to prevent it or reduce its impact. The coroner queried whether the fatal outcome would have occurred if the fire’s impact had even been reduced slightly.

The Deputy State Coroner had referred in the coronial report to the "very strident" public criticism of volunteer Incident Management Teams that had occurred. However, his concluding remarks were: "The CFS have effected much change since this incident. Recommendations made in two separate inquiries – namely Project Phoenix and the inquiry conducted by Dr Bob Smith – have been, or are being, implemented. In addition, a number of initiatives have been implemented that have resulted in more effective and timely communication in incident settings. The implementation of change is to be applauded. The response of the Country Fire Service to this incident and that of its Chief Officer, Mr Euan Ferguson, has, in my view, been exemplary."
