= Tucknott Scrub Conservation Park =

Protected area in South Australia

- IUCN category VI (protected area with sustainable use of natural resources)
- Location within South Australia
- Location: South Australia
- Nearest city: Wanilla
- Coordinates: 34°29′10″S 135°48′11″E
- Area: 3.63 km^{2} (1.40 sq mi)
- Established: 12 January 2006
- Governing body: Department for Environment and Water

Tucknott Scrub Conservation Park is a protected area located in the Australian state of South Australia on the Eyre Peninsula in the gazetted locality of Whites Flat about 12 kilometres (7.5 miles) north-east of the town centre in Wanilla and about 30 kilometres (19 miles) north of the municipal seat of Port Lincoln.

The conservation park was proclaimed on 12 January 2006 under the National Parks and Wildlife Act 1972 in respect to crown land located in the cadastral unit of the Hundred of Louth to “conserve remnant habitat for a number of threatened plants and animals of national significance”. It was proclaimed to permit “existing and future rights of access under the Mining Act 1971”. Its name is derived from “the Tucknott Family who owned the land”.

In 2007, the conservation park was described by its managing authority as follows:

Tucknott Scrub Conservation Park is an undulating area of gently sloping land and steeper hills covered with heath, wet heath and Sugar Gum (Eucalyptus cladocalyx) woodland. The park (sic) has two ephemeral creeks, which form part of the Tod catchment area of the Tod Reservoir. Tucknott Scrub Conservation Park is the largest remnant of Sugar Gum woodland in the Koppio Hills, and is important feeding habitat and potential breeding habitat for the state vulnerable and regionally threatened Yellow-tailed Black-Cockatoo (Calyptorynchus funereus ssp. xanthanotus).

The conservation park is classified as an IUCN Category VI protected area.

== See also ==
- Protected areas of South Australia
