= Murrunatta Conservation Park =

Protected area in South Australia

- IUCN category III (natural monument or feature)
- Location within South Australia
- Location: South Australia
- Nearest city: Wanilla
- Coordinates: 34°32′08″S 135°35′19″E
- Area: 5.16 km^{2} (1.99 sq mi)
- Established: 29 March 1984
- Governing body: Department for Environment and Water

Murrunatta Conservation Park is a protected area in the Australian state of South Australia located on the Eyre Peninsula in the gazetted localities of Wangary and Wanilla about 8 kilometres (5.0 miles) west of the town centre in Wanilla and about 30 kilometres (19 miles) north-west of municipal seat of Port Lincoln.

The conservation park consists of two parcels of land located on either side of Settlers Road, which is the boundary between Wangary on its west-side and Wanilla on its east-side. Its name is derived from two Aboriginal words - "'murra' meaning sand and 'natta' meaning ridge".

The parcel of land in Wangary which consists of section 99 in the cadastral unit of the Hundred of Wanilla was proclaimed under the National Parks and Wildlife Act 1972 on 29 March 1984 for the purpose of conserving “a small area of remnant mallee vegetation dominated by coast ridge-fruited mallee (Eucalyptus angulosa)”.

The parcel of land in Wanilla which consists of “Allotment 11 in Deposited Plan (DP) 25772” in the Hundred of Wanilla, was crown land originally proclaimed under the Crown Lands Act 1929 on 11 November 1993 as a conservation reserve for the purpose of conserving “small area of mallee vegetation dominated by swamp paperbark (Melaleuca halmaturorum)”. The parcel of land was added by proclamation on 7 December 2006 to the Murrunatta Conservation Park. This part of the conservation park was described in 2007 as being “low-lying, is regularly subject to inundation and provides habitat for the nationally vulnerable Eyre Peninsula southern emu-wren (Stipiturus malachurus parimeda)”.

The conservation park is classified as an IUCN Category III protected area.

== See also ==
- Protected areas of South Australia
