= Farm Beach, South Australia =

Farm Beach South Australia
- Coordinates: 34°29′53″S 135°23′46″E
- Established: 15 October 2009
- Postcode(s): 5607
- Time zone: ACST (UTC+9:30)
  - Summer (DST): ACST (UTC+10:30)
- Location: 297 km (185 mi) west of Adelaide; 40 km (25 mi) south-west of Cummins
- LGA(s): District Council of Lower Eyre Peninsula
- Region: Eyre Western
- County: Flinders
- State electorate(s): Flinders
- Federal division(s): Grey
Mean max temp	Mean min temp	Annual rainfall
21.3 °C; 70 °F	11.4 °C; 53 °F	394.6 mm 15.5 in
Suburbs around Farm Beach:
Coffin Bay (body of water)	Coulta	Coulta
Coffin Bay (body of water)	Farm Beach	Coulta
Coffin Bay (body of water)	Little Douglas	Little Douglas
- Footnotes: Coordinates; Locations; Climate; Adjoining localities

Farm Beach is a locality in the Australian state of South Australia located on the Eyre Peninsula in the state’s west overlooking the body of water known as Coffin Bay about 297 kilometres (185 mi) west of the state capital of Adelaide and about 40 kilometres (25 mi) south-west of the municipal seat of Cummins.

Its boundaries were created on 15 October 2009 around a parcel of land used for the former Farm Beach Shack Site. The shack site had originally been incorporated in the locality of Coulta on 16 October 2003. It was created after a request by the District Council of Lower Eyre Peninsula to “use the well established local name.” Its name is derived from the former shack site.

The locality contains a settlement consisting of permanent dwellings, a camping ground and vehicle parking. Its coastline includes a boat ramp and an unpatrolled swimming beach which is considered by the Surf Life Saving Australia to be ‘least hazardous’.

Land use within the locality consists of a ‘coastal conservation’ zone along the coastline in its west, an area zoned for ‘primary production’ in its north-east and an area in its centre zoned for ‘coastal settlement’ which has a desired character which encourages development involving low-rise detached dwellings.

Farm Beach is located within the federal division of Grey, the state electoral district of Flinders and the local government area of the District Council of Lower Eyre Peninsula.
