= Tod River =

- Location within South Australia

Location
- Country: Australia
- State: South Australia
- Region: Eyre Peninsula

Physical characteristics
- Mouth
  - location: Between Poonindie and North Shields
  - coordinates: 34.592°S 135.903°E
  - elevation: 0 m
- Length: 26 miles (42 km)
- Discharge
  - location: Spencer Gulf

Basin features
- Waterbodies: Tod River Reservoir

The Tod River is the only stream on Eyre Peninsula in South Australia with a reliable water flow. Its main tributary is Pillaworta Creek. The Tod River Reservoir was built across the river between 1918 and 1922.

The Tod River flows southeast into the lower Spencer Gulf north of Port Lincoln. Its lower reach represents the boundary between Poonindie and North Shields.

The original Barngarla name for Tod River was Ngalda Warda.

The river was named on 20 May 1839 by a group exploring Spencer Gulf in the schooner Victoria after Robert Tod, one of the exploration party. Victoria spent April and May 1839 surveying for land in the Spencer Gulf region.
