= Mount Dutton Bay Conservation Park =

Protected area in South Australia

- IUCN category Ia (strict nature reserve)
- Location within South Australia
- Location: South Australia
- Nearest city: Coffin Bay
- Coordinates: 34°37′12″S 135°25′58″E
- Area: 9 ha (22 acres)
- Established: 16 March 1967
- Governing body: Department for Environment and Water

Mount Dutton Bay Conservation Park is a protected area in the Australian state of South Australia located on the west coast of Eyre Peninsula on islands located on waters in the sector between the north west to the east of the town of Coffin Bay.

The conservation park consists of a number of islands located in the following bays subsidiary to Coffin Bay - Port Douglas, Mount Dutton Bay and Kellidie Bay. Three of the islands are located in Port Douglas, being The Brothers and an unnamed group immediately west of Horse Peninsula and Rabbit Island immediately west of Coffin Bay township. Another island is located at the north end of Mount Dutton Bay, while Goat Island immediately north of Coffin Bay township in the channel connecting Port Douglas to Kellidie Bay.

The land in the conservation park first received protection as "fauna conservation reserves" under the Crown Lands Act 1929 on 16 March 1967. On 27 April 1972, the land under protection was reconstituted as the Mount Dutton Bay Conservation Park upon the proclamation of the National Parks and Wildlife Act 1972. On 4 November 1993, additional land consisting of two unnamed islands located west of Horse Peninsula were added to the conservation park. As of 2018, it covered an area of 9 hectares (22 acres).

In 1980, the conservation park was described as follows:

These islands were declared a reserve because of their significance as breeding grounds for seabirds, including the uncommon reef heron, sooty oyster catcher, crested and caspian terns, fairy penguins, pacific and silver gulls. All five species of cormorant utilize the islands including large roosting colonies of black-faced and large pied cormorants. Rock parrots, silvereyes and the little grass bird are also known to nest here...

Several small, low-lying, limestone and sand islands in Coffin Bay. Natural vegetation has largely been replaced by introduced grasses and shrubs...

With the exception of the unnamed island at the mouth of Dutton Bay, which is linked to the Mainland at low tide, the islands, in the absence of introduced predators offer secure breeding and roosting sites.

The conservation park is classified as an IUCN Category Ia protected area. In 1980, it was listed on the now-defunct Register of the National Estate.
