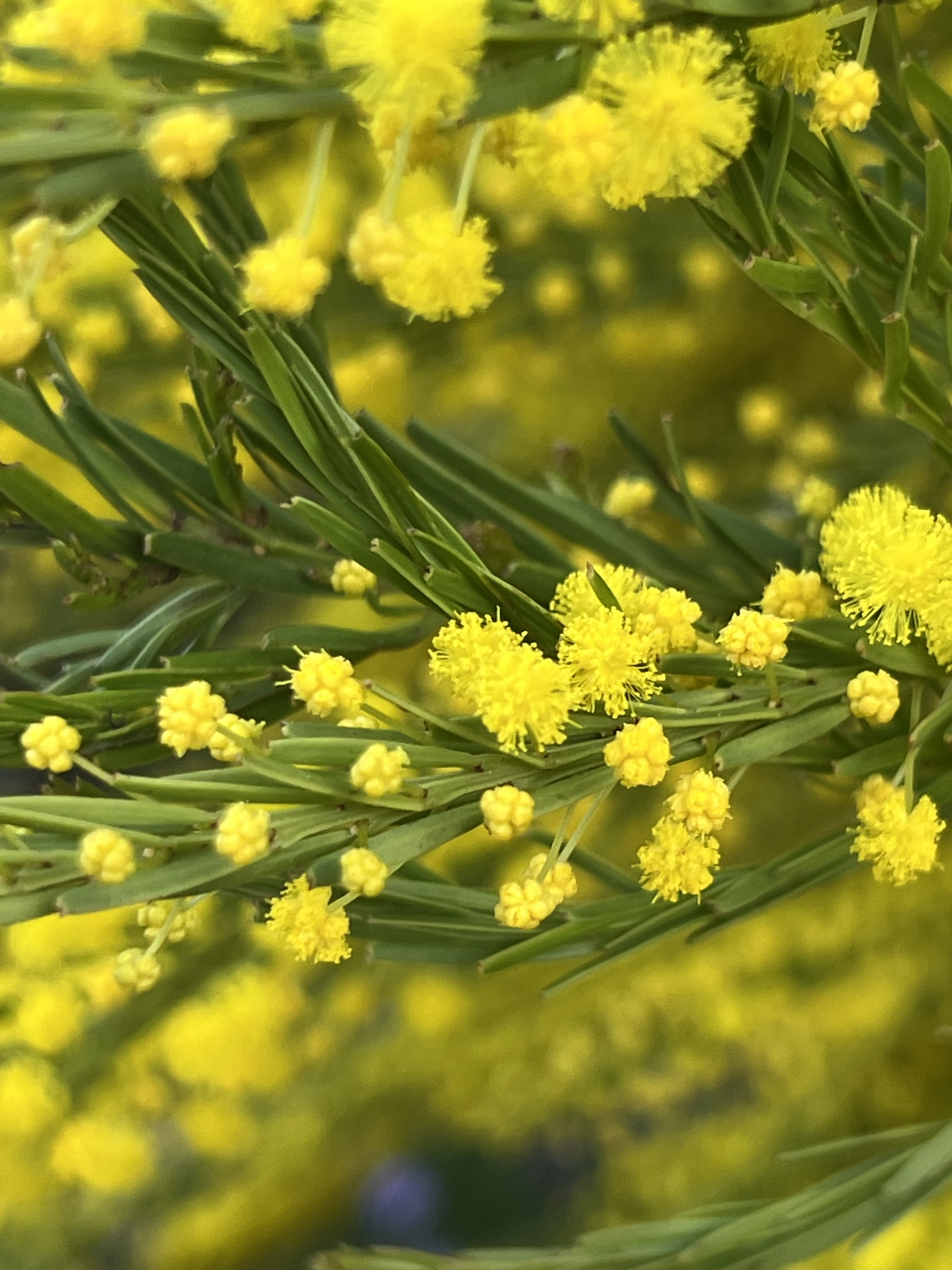

Scientific classification
- Kingdom: Plantae
- Clade: Tracheophytes
- Clade: Angiosperms
- Clade: Eudicots
- Clade: Rosids
- Order: Fabales
- Family: Fabaceae
- Subfamily: Caesalpinioideae
- Clade: Mimosoid clade
- Genus: Acacia
- Species: A. imbricata

Binomial name
- Acacia imbricata F.Muell.
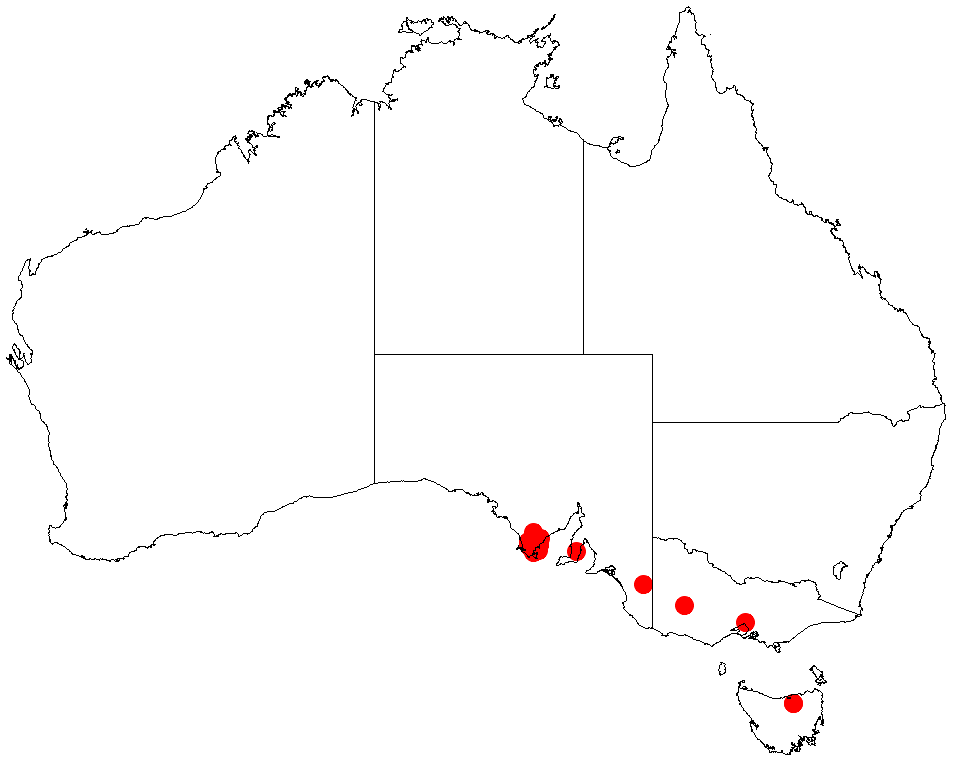
- Occurrence data from AVH

Synonyms
- Racosperma imbricatum (F.Muell.) Pedley; Acacia lineata auct. non A.Cunn. ex G.Don: Bentham, G. (5 October 1864)

= Acacia imbricata =

Species of plant

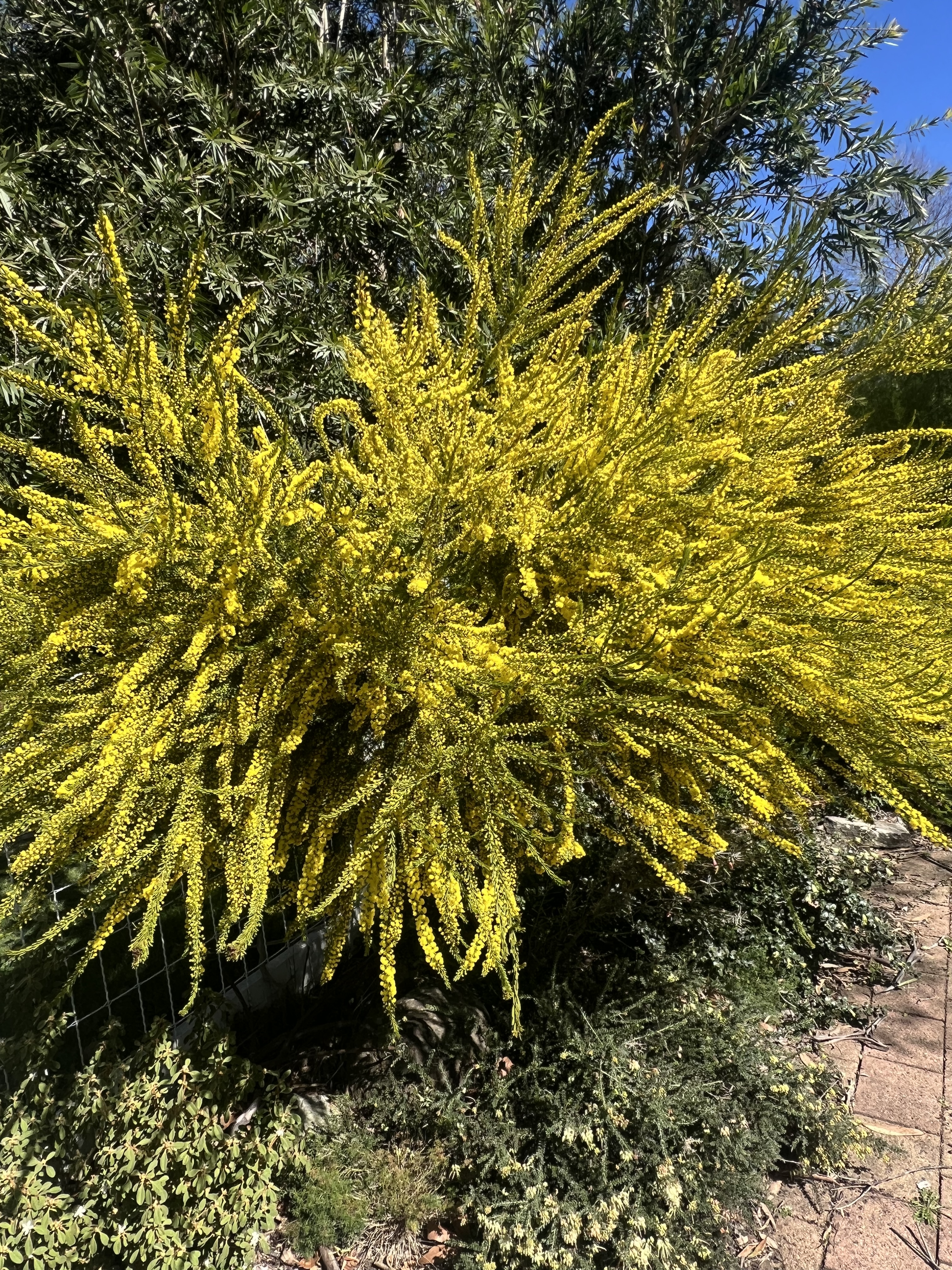
Habit

Acacia imbricata commonly known as imbricate wattle, is a species of flowering plant in the family Fabaceae and is endemic to South Australia. It is a dense, spreading, glabrous shrub with crowded, erect, narrowly oblong or linear to lance-shaped phyllodes with the narrower end towards the base, prolific, spherical heads of bright golden yellow flowers linear, firmly papery pods.

== Description ==
Acacia imbricata is a dense, spreading, glabrous shrub that typically grows to a height of 1–2 m (3 ft 3 in – 6 ft 7 in) and has somewhat willowly branches. Its branchlets are strongly angled near the ends and ribbed below the insertion of the phyllodes. The phyllodes are crowded, erect, narrowly oblong or linear to lance-shaped with the narrower end towards the base, 10–18 mm (0.39–0.71 in) long and 1–2 mm (0.039–0.079 in) wide, the midrib not prominent and there are no lateral veins. The flowers are borne in one or two spherical heads in axils on slender peduncles 4–10 mm (0.16–0.39 in) long, each head with 9 to 15 bright golden yellow flowers. Flowering occurs from July to September, and the pods are linear, more or less straight, up to 70 mm (2.8 in) long, 4.5–6 mm (0.18–0.24 in) wide and firmly papery. The seeds are oblong to broadly egg-shaped or elliptic, 3.5–4.0 mm (0.14–0.16 in) long, shiny dark brown with a club-shaped aril near the end.

== Taxonomy and naming ==
This species was first formally described in 1858 by Victorian Government Botanist Ferdinand von Mueller in his Fragmenta Phytographiae Australiae. His description was based on plant material collected at Tumby Bay by Carl Wilhelmi. The specific epithet (imbricata) means 'overlapping'.

== Distribution ==
Imbricate wattle has a limited distribution in the south east of the Eyre Peninsula in the Eyre Yorke Block bioregion, from around the Yeelanna–Ungarra road in the north down to around Koppio and Warunda in the south where it usually grows in open woodland, forest or open scrub in sandy soils.

== See also ==
- List of Acacia species
