= Wangary, South Australia =

Wangary
- Town
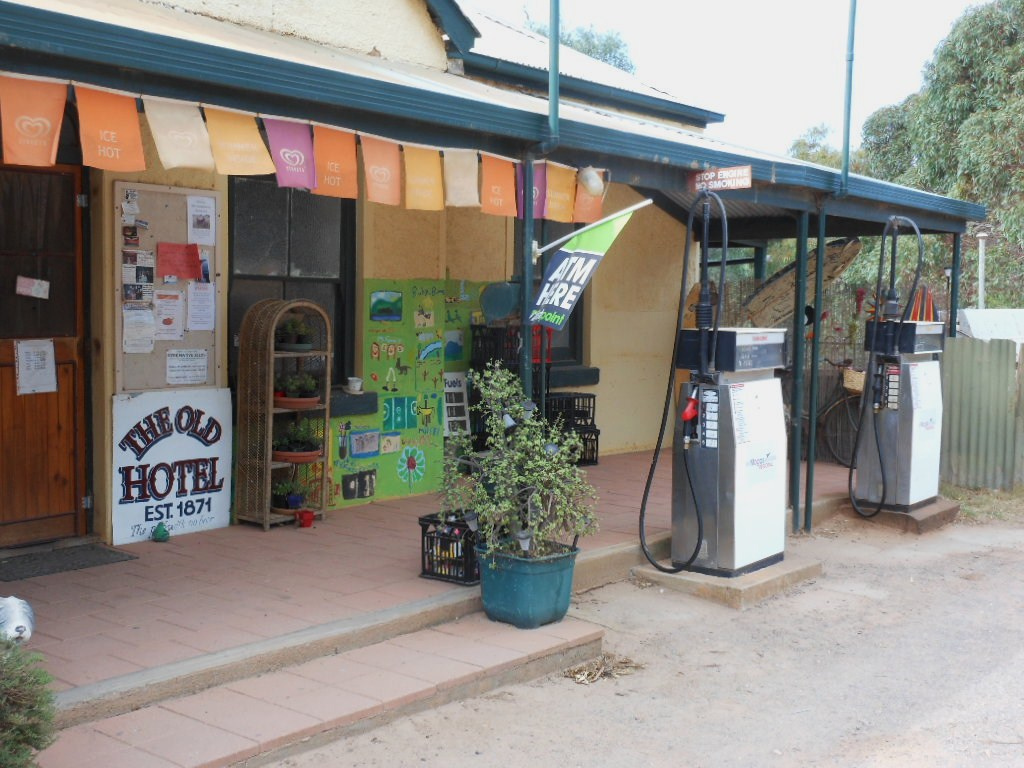

- Coordinates: 34°33′0″S 135°29′0″E
- Country: Australia
- State: South Australia
- Region: Eyre Western
- LGA: Lower Eyre Peninsula DC
- Location: 45 km (28 mi) W of Port Lincoln

Government
  - State electorate: Flinders
  - Federal division: Grey
- Elevation: 35 m (115 ft)

Population
  - Total: 203 (SAL 2021)
- Postcode: 5607
- County: Flinders
- Mean max temp: 21.4 °C (70.5 °F)
- Mean min temp: 11.4 °C (52.5 °F)
- Annual rainfall: 352.0 mm (13.86 in)
Localities around Wangary
Coulta	Coulta; Edillilie	Edillilie
Mount Dutton Bay	Wangary	Wanilla; Fountain
Kellidie Bay	Coffin Bay	Uley

Wangary is a town on the Eyre Peninsula in South Australia, located 45 kilometres (28 mi) west of Port Lincoln on the Flinders Highway near Coffin Bay.

At the 2006 census, Wangary had a population of 289. It is located in the cadastral Hundred of Lake Wangary. It surrounds the freshwater Lake Wangary.

The government town of Wangary was surveyed in 1871 though never formally proclaimed. It was incorporated into the modern broader locality of Wangary when the boundaries of the latter were formalised in October 2003. The Old Lake Wangary Hotel was built in 1871, and is one of the main surviving structures in town; it has not had a liquor license since 1933, but remains open as a general store. The sports oval and ruins of the former post office (established 1862, closed 1976), coach house and bakery are located nearby. Lake Wangary Primary School, located on Third Street, has existed since 1933.

Lake Wangary Cemetery, located on Snapper Hill Road, was first proclaimed in 1882 and used until the early 1900s, before being resurveyed as a modern cemetery in 1984. It is now maintained by the local council.

There are nearby inselbergs called the Marble Range. They possess many unique lifeforms, some of which has been described scientifically.

Colonial views of the Lake Wangary area were done in the 1840s by English Colonial Artist George French Angas. His artwork is incorporated into one of South Australia's most valuable books – 'South Australia Illustrated'.

== See also ==
- List of cities and towns in South Australia
- Eyre Peninsula bushfire
- Murrunatta Conservation Park
- Kellidie Bay Conservation Park
