= County of Flinders =

Flinders
- Cadastral division
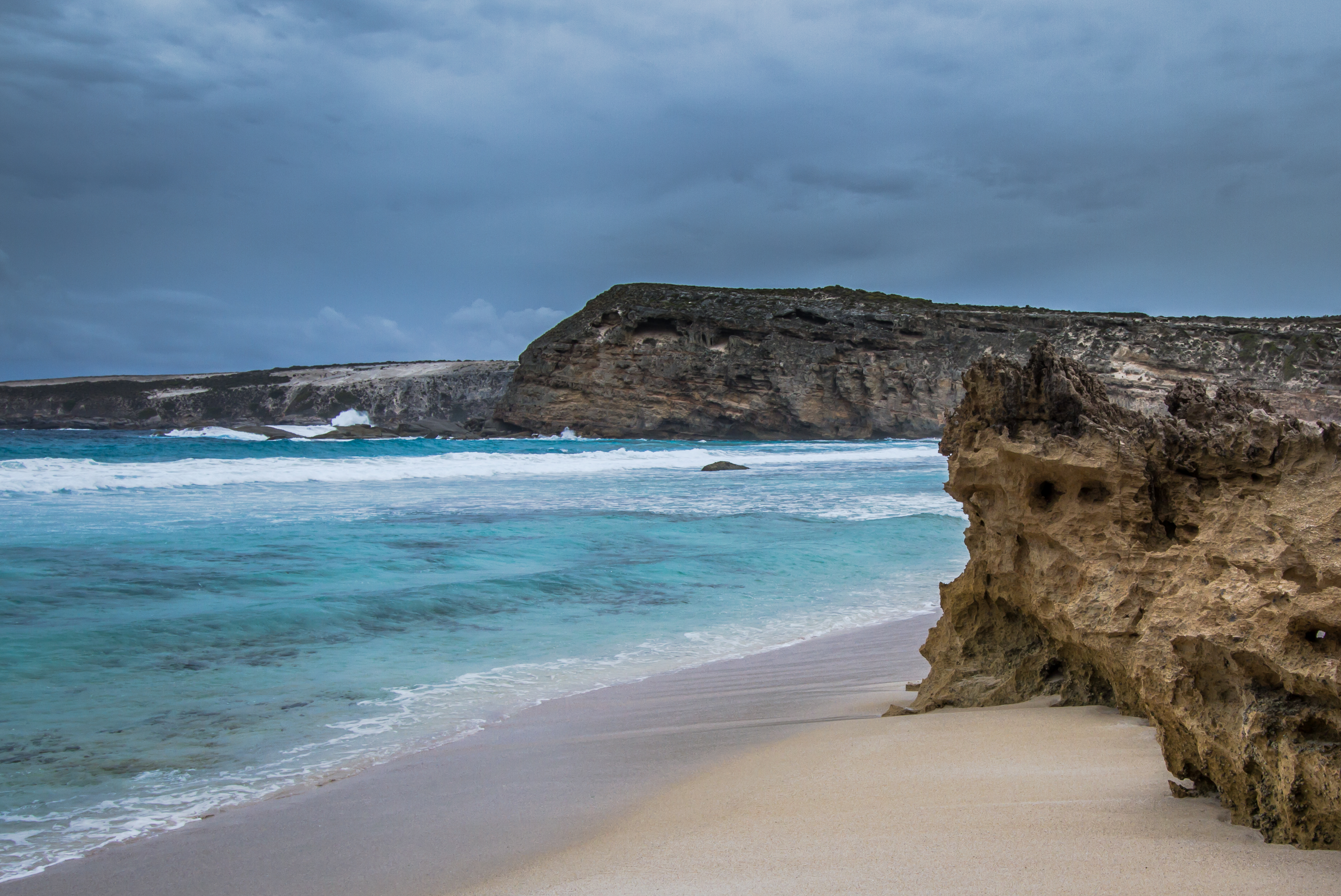
- Curta Rocks on the southern coast of Eyre Peninsula in the County of Flinders

- Coordinates: 34.502°S 135.699°E
- Country: Australia
- State: South Australia
- Region: Eyre Western
- LGA(s): City of Port Lincoln District Council of Lower Eyre Peninsula District Council of Tumby Bay
- Established: 1842

Area
  - Total: 4,760 km^{2} (1,838 sq mi)
Lands administrative divisions around Flinders
Musgrave	Musgrave; Jervois	Jervois
Ocean	Flinders	Spencer Gulf
Ocean	Ocean	Spencer Gulf

The County of Flinders is one of the 49 cadastral counties of South Australia. The county covers the southern part of the Eyre Peninsula “bounded on the north by a line connecting Point Drummond with Cape Burr, and on all other sides by the seacoast, including all islands adjacent to the main land.”

== History ==
The county was proclaimed by George Grey, the third Governor of South Australia, on 2 June 1842. The county originally extended from Cape Wiles on the west side of the peninsula to Cape Catastrophe in the south and to the “northern extremity of Louth Bay” on the Peninsula’s east coast. The county was enlarged to its present extent in 1872. It was named by Grey after Matthew Flinders, the British navigator.

The District Council of Lincoln was established at Port Lincoln in 1880, the earliest local government within the county. In 1888, the enactment of the District Councils Act 1887 brought the entire county under the governance of the Lincoln council.

== List of constituent hundreds ==
=== Location of constituent hundreds ===
The county consists of 15 hundreds. The hundreds are laid out from east to west in five rows (from north to south) as follows:

1. Ulipa, Cummins, Stokes and Yaranyacka all along the northern boundary of the county,
2. Warrow, Mortlock, Koppio and Hutchison,
3. Lake Wangary, Wanilla and Louth,
4. Uley and Lincoln, and
5. Sleaford and Flinders at the southern end of Eyre Peninsula.

=== Hundred of Cummins ===
The Hundred of Cummins (34°15′14″S 135°39′50″E) was proclaimed on 15 January 1903. It covers an area of 400 square kilometres (153 sq mi) and its name was derived from William Patrick Cummins, a member of the South Australian Parliament from 1896 to 1907. It is entirely located within the boundaries of the locality of Cummins.

=== Hundred of Flinders ===
The Hundred of Flinders (34°51′52″S 135°54′29″E) was proclaimed on 26 November 1903. It covers an area of 260 square kilometres (101 sq mi) and its name was derived from Matthew Flinders, the British navigator. Its boundaries coincide with the boundaries of the locality of Lincoln National Park.

=== Hundred of Hutchison ===
The Hundred of Hutchison was proclaimed in 1867 and is home to Tumby Bay township and surrounds as well as a small eastern portion of Yallunda Flat locality.

=== Hundred of Koppio ===
The Hundred of Koppio (34°24′03″S 135°51′46″E) was proclaimed on 24 October 1867. It covers an area of 280 square kilometres (110 sq mi) and its name is derived from an Aboriginal word meaning ‘oysters’. Its northern half is within the locality of Yallunda Flat while its southern half is in Koppio and its south-east corner is in Tumby Bay.

=== Hundred of Lake Wangary ===
The Hundred of Lake Wangary (34°39′54″S 135°25′32″E) was proclaimed on 16 February 1871. It covers an area of 470 square kilometres (180 sq mi) and its name is derived from Lake Wangary. Its extent includes the localities of Coffin Bay, Kellidie Bay, Little Douglas and Mount Dutton Bay and part of the locality of Wangary.

=== Hundred of Lincoln ===
The Hundred of Lincoln (34°43′02″S 135°46′56″E) was proclaimed on 7 August 1851. It covers an area of 270 square kilometres (104 sq mi) and its name is derived from the settlement of Port Lincoln. Its extent includes the full extent of the localities of Boston, Duck Ponds, Hawson, Port Lincoln, Tiatukia and Tulka, parts of the localities of Coomunga, North Shields and Tootenilla as well as all of the island of Boston Island.

=== Hundred of Louth ===
The Hundred of Louth (34°33′10″S 135°51′29″E) was proclaimed on 7 August 1851. It covers an area of 265 square kilometres (102.5 sq mi) and its name is derived from the island of Louth Island. Its extent includes the full extent of the localities of Point Boston, Poonindie, Louth Bay, Whites Flat and Whites River, parts of the localities of Charlton Gully, Green Patch, North Shields, Tumby Bay and Wanilla as well as all of the island of Louth Island.

=== Hundred of Mortlock ===
The Hundred of Mortlock (34°24′11″S 135°39′48″E) was proclaimed on 20 October 1904. It covers an area of 310 square kilometres (120 sq mi) and its name is derived from William Tennant Mortlock who was a member of the South Australian Parliament and was reported as being “a large landholder on the Eyre Peninsula.” Its extent includes the full extent of the locality of Edillilie in its south while a part of the locality of Cummins occupies part of its north.

=== Hundred of Sleaford ===
The Hundred of Sleaford (34°51′08″S 135°40′38″E) was proclaimed on 10 August 1871. It covers an area of 190 square kilometres (72 sq mi) and its name is derived from the body of water known as Sleaford Bay. Its extent aligns with that of the locality of Sleaford with one exception in its north-east corner where part of the adjoining locality of Tulka extends into the hundred.

=== Hundred of Stokes ===
The Hundred of Stokes was proclaimed on 21 November 1878 and includes the locality of Cockaleechie and parts of the localities of Ungarra, Tumby Bay and Yallunda Flat.

=== Hundred of Uley ===
The Hundred of Uley (34°44′01″S 135°37′26″E) was proclaimed on 10 August 1871. It covers an area of 330 square kilometres (128 sq mi) and its name is derived from “a village in Gloucestershire, England." The majority of Its extent is in the locality of Uley with a portion of Coomunga in its north-east corner.

=== Hundred of Ulipa ===
The Hundred of Ulipa (34°15′22″S 135°26′53″E) was proclaimed on 18 September 1879. It covers an area of 350 square kilometres (136 sq mi) and its name is derived from an Aboriginal word. The majority of Its extent is in the locality of Mount Drummond with portions of the following localities overlapping its boundaries from north to south - Mount Hope, Kappinnie, .Cummins and Coulta.

=== Hundred of Wanilla ===
The Hundred of Wanilla (34°32′41″S 135°39′31″E) was proclaimed on 10 August 1871. Its name is derived from an Aboriginal name for “a nearby spring.” Its extent includes the localities of Fountain and Pearlah in its south with the locality of Wanilla occupying its northern half with portions of Charlton Gully and Green Patch on its east side and with Wangary on its west side.

=== Hundred of Warrow ===
The Hundred of Warrow (34°25′17″S 135°27′57″E) was proclaimed on 15 July 1869. It covers an area of 280 square kilometres (110 sq mi). Two possible sources exist for the name. The first is an “Aboriginal word referring to the loud voice of the storm or referring to spirits rushing down gullies” while the second is “native ‘warraw’ meaning ‘wind in gully’ which was offered by a pastoralist named McMoyan in 1943. The majority of Its extent is in the locality of Coulta with a portion of Cummins in its north-east corner and the locality of Farm Beach.

=== Hundred of Yaranyacka ===
The Hundred of Yaranyacka (34°14′52″S 136°08′55″E) was proclaimed on 20 June 1872. Its name is derived from an Aboriginal word. Its extent includes the full extent of the locality of Lipson with a portion of Ungarra in its north-west corner.

== See also ==
- Electoral district of Flinders
