= Little Douglas, South Australia =

Little Douglas South Australia
- Coordinates: 34°31′46″S 135°23′08″E
- Population: 8 (SAL 2021)
- Established: 15 October 2009
- Postcode(s): 5607
- Time zone: ACST (UTC+9:30)
  - Summer (DST): ACST (UTC+10:30)
- Location: 295 km (183 mi) west of Adelaide; 42 km (26 mi) south-west of Cummins
- LGA(s): District Council of Lower Eyre Peninsula
- Region: Eyre Western
- County: Flinders
- State electorate(s): Flinders
- Federal division(s): Grey
| Mean max temp | Mean min temp | Annual rainfall |
| 21.3 °C; 70 °F | 11.4 °C; 53 °F | 394.6 mm 15.5 in |
Suburbs around Little Douglas:
| Coffin Bay (body of water) | Farm Beach; Coulta | Coulta |
| Coffin Bay (body of water) | Little Douglas | Mount Dutton Bay; Coffin Bay (body of water) |
| Coffin Bay (body of water) | Coffin Bay (body of water) | Coffin Bay (body of water) |
- Footnotes: Locations; Adjoining localities

Little Douglas (previously Horse Peninsula) is a locality in the Australian state of South Australia located on the Eyre Peninsula in the state’s west overlooking the body of water known as Coffin Bay about 293 kilometres (182 mi) west of the state capital of Adelaide and about 42 kilometres (26 mi) south-west of the municipal seat of Cummins.

Its boundaries were created on 16 October 2003 for the "long established name" of Horse Peninsula and which included the former Little Douglas Shack Site. On 15 October 2009, it was renamed as Little Douglas after the former shack site after a request from the District Council of Lower Eyre Peninsula to use "the well established local name of Little Douglas.”

Little Douglas occupies most of the Horse Peninsula, a peninsula which extends in a north-south direction within the Coffin Bay body of water dividing it into halves.

The locality contains a settlement consisting of permanent dwellings located on the south side of a tidal lagoon known as Little Douglas Bay. Its coastline south of Little Douglas Bay includes an unpatrolled swimming beach which is considered by the Surf Life Saving Australia to be ‘least hazardous’.

Land use within the locality consists of a ‘coastal conservation’ zone occupying most of the Horse Peninsula, an area in its centre zoned for ‘coastal settlement’ which has a desired character which encourages development involving low-rise detached dwellings, and land to the east of the settlement is zoned for ‘aquaculture’ for the provision of “land-based facilities for marine-based aquaculture farms” located within Coffin Bay.

Little Douglas is located within the federal division of Grey, the state electoral district of Flinders and the local government area of the District Council of Lower Eyre Peninsula.
