= Mount Dutton Bay, South Australia =

Mount Dutton Bay
- Town
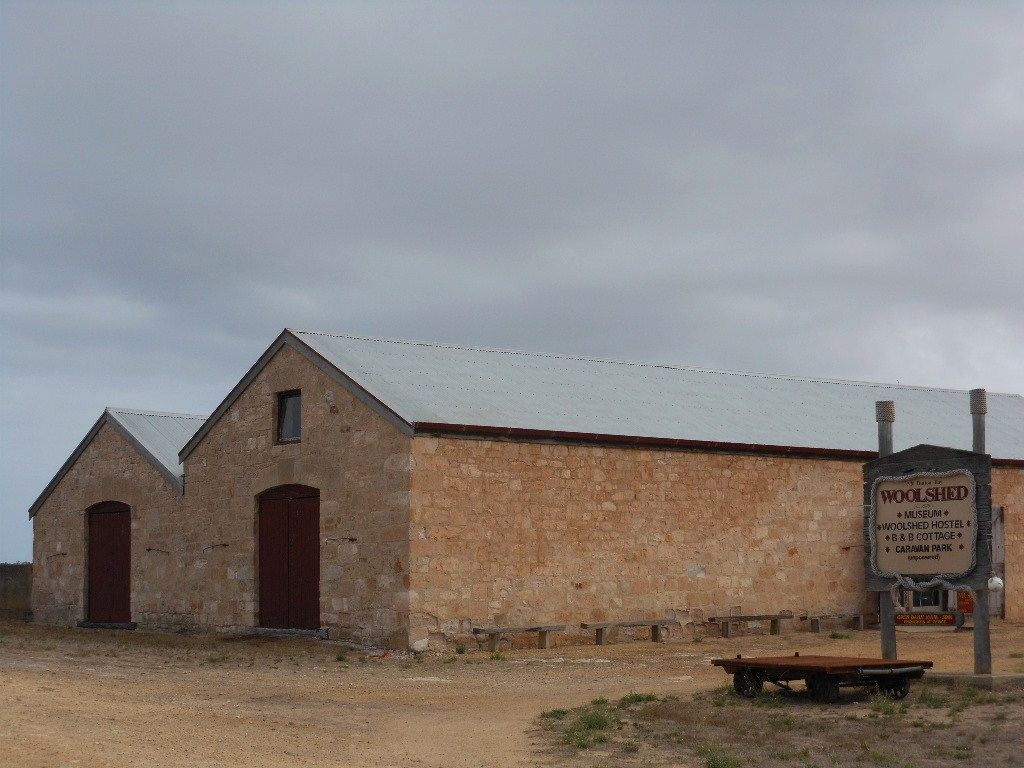

- Coordinates: 34.527°S 135.429°E
- Country: Australia
- State: South Australia
- Region: Eyre Western

Government
  - State electorate: Flinders
  - Federal division: Grey

Population
  - Total: 53 (SAL 2021)
- Postcode: 5607
- County: Flinders
Localities around Mount Dutton Bay
Coulta	Coulta	Wangary
Little Douglas	Mount Dutton Bay	Wangary
Great Australian Bight	Great Australian Bight	Wangary

Mount Dutton Bay is a coastal locality in the Eyre and Western region of South Australia, situated in the District Council of Lower Eyre Peninsula. The name and boundaries were formalised in October 2003 in respect of the long established local name which is derived from the body of water known as Mount Dutton Bay. The locality incorporates three older residential "shack sites": Mount Dutton Bay West, on Dolphin Drive, Mount Dutton Bay East, on Woolshed Drive, and Shelley Beach/Salt Creek, on Shelly Beach Road. It is part of the cadastral Hundred of Lake Wangary.

The historic Mount Dutton Bay Woolshed and Mount Dutton Bay Jetty are listed on the South Australian Heritage Register. The woolshed and jetty were built by Eyre Peninsula pastoral pioneer Price Maurice to shear wool from his pastoral leases and transport it to markets; the jetty, the latter of the two, dates from 1881. The site was used as a hub for the wool industry until the 1950s; it has continued as a base for leisure activities thereafter. The woolshed and adjacent shearers' quarters now house tourist accommodation, a museum, cafe and gallery; a caravan park has also been built alongside.

The Mount Dutton Bay Conservation Park is located on islands in Mount Dutton Bay and other adjoining bodies of water.

The Aboriginal Barngarla name for "Mount Dutton" is Miranda.
