= Yallunda Flat, South Australia =

Yallunda Flat
- Suburb
- Coordinates: 34.34747662°S 135.87866751°E
- Country: Australia
- State: South Australia
- LGA: District Council of Tumby Bay
- Location: 257 km (160 mi) west of Adelaide; 20 km (12 mi) w of Tumby Bay
- Established: 1998

Government
  - State electorate: Flinders
  - Federal division: Grey

Population
  - Total: 120 (2021 census)
- Time zone: UTC+9:30 (ACST)
  - Summer (DST): UTC+10:30 (ACST)
- Postcode: 5607
- Mean max temp: 21.2 °C (70.2 °F)
- Mean min temp: 11.4 °C (52.5 °F)
- Annual rainfall: 389.7 mm (15.34 in)
Suburbs around Yallunda Flat
Cummins	Cockaleechie	Ungarra
Cummins; Edillilie	Yallunda Flat	Tumby Bay
Edillilie	Koppio	Tumby Bay
- Distances; Coordinates; Climate; Adjoining localities

Yallunda Flat is a locality in the Australian state of South Australia located on the Eyre Peninsula about 257 kilometres (160 miles) west of the state capital of Adelaide. Both its name and boundaries were created in 1998. The name is derived from the local landform of the same name. It includes the following two places which have been gazetted as "unbounded localities" – Kapinka and Urrano. Yallunda Flat is located within the federal division of Grey, the state electoral district of Flinders and the local government area of the District Council of Tumby Bay.

== See also ==
- List of cities and towns in South Australia
- Eyre Peninsula bushfire
