= Kellidie Bay Conservation Park =

Protected area in South Australia

- IUCN category Ia (strict nature reserve)
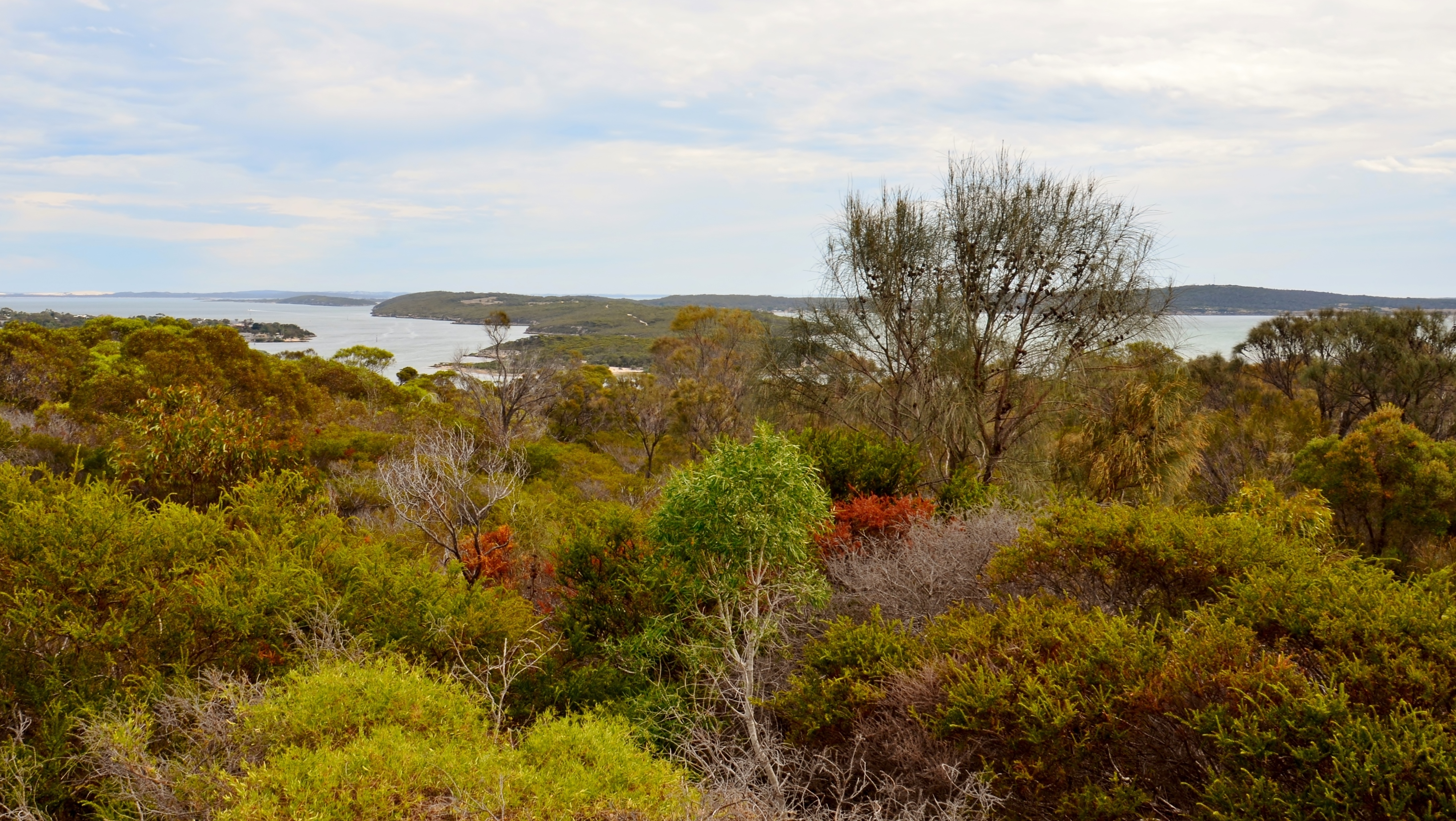

- Location within South Australia
- Location: South Australia, Coffin Bay, Kellidie Bay and Wangary
- Nearest city: Coffin Bay
- Coordinates: 34°36′32″S 135°31′56″E
- Area: 17.84 km^{2} (6.89 sq mi)
- Established: 30 September 1958
- Governing body: Department for Environment and Water

Kellidie Bay Conservation Park (formerly the Kellidie Bay National Park) is a protected area in the Australian state of South Australia, located on the west coast of Eyre Peninsula immediately east of the town centre in Coffin Bay and immediately adjoining the south coast of Kellidie Bay in the localities of Coffin Bay, Kellidie Bay and Wangary.

It was reported as being proclaimed as early as 1954 in order "to conserve wildlife and the natural and historic features of the land". On 9 November 1967, it was proclaimed under the National Parks Act 1966 as the Kellidie Bay National Park. On 27 April 1972, it was reconstituted as Kellidie Bay Conservation Park upon the proclamation of the National Parks and Wildlife Act 1972. As of 2016, it covered an area of 17.84 square kilometres (6.89 sq mi).

In 1980, the conservation park was described as follows:

…consists of low limestone ridges with a cover of black tea tree (Melaleuca lanceolata) and she-oak (Casuarina stricta) woodland. Near the coast there are flat moist areas with much cutting grass (Gahnia spp.). Western grey kangaroos and emus shelter in the high ground and feed on the lower flats. Tiger snakes and Cape Barren geese also occur here.

The following statement of significance was published in 1980:

Kellidie Bay Conservation Park preserves a representative area of Casuarina stricta, Melaleuca lanceolata woodland and Gahnia spp. herbland. It is a very picturesque area and a popular tourist attraction. The uncommon white-breasted sea-eagle and osprey occur here.

The conservation park is classified as an IUCN Category Ia protected area. In 1980, it was listed on the now-defunct Register of the National Estate.
