= Cockaleechie, South Australia =

Cockaleechie
- Town
- Coordinates: 34°12′34″S 135°50′34″E
- Country: Australia
- State: South Australia
- Region: Eyre Western
- LGA: District Council of Tumby Bay
- Location: 62 km (39 mi) N of Port Lincoln; 20 km (12 mi) E of Cummins

Government
  - State electorate: Flinders
  - Federal division: Grey
- Elevation: 115 m (377 ft)

Population
  - Total: 79 (2021)
- Postcode: 5631
- County: Flinders
Localities around Cockaleechie
Yeelanna	Brooker
Cummins	Cockaleechie	Ungarra
	Yallunda Flat

Cockaleechie is a locality on Eyre Peninsula in South Australia.

It was served by a siding on the Eyre Peninsula Railway, but as it has no bulk silos, has not been used for some time. The town was named for the railway station, which in turn was named for the Cockaleechie Run pastoral lease held by James Anderson since 1860. Anderson was Scottish, and the run was probably named as a variant of cockaleekie, a Scottish soup of cock boiled with leeks. The siding opened in December 1913.

Famous Australian former tennis player John Fitzgerald was born and schooled in the nearby town of Cummins but was raised in Cockaleechie which is where he gets his nickname: the Cockaleechie Kid.
