= Hundred of Warrow =

Administrative division in South Australia

Coordinates: 34.420°S 135.467°E

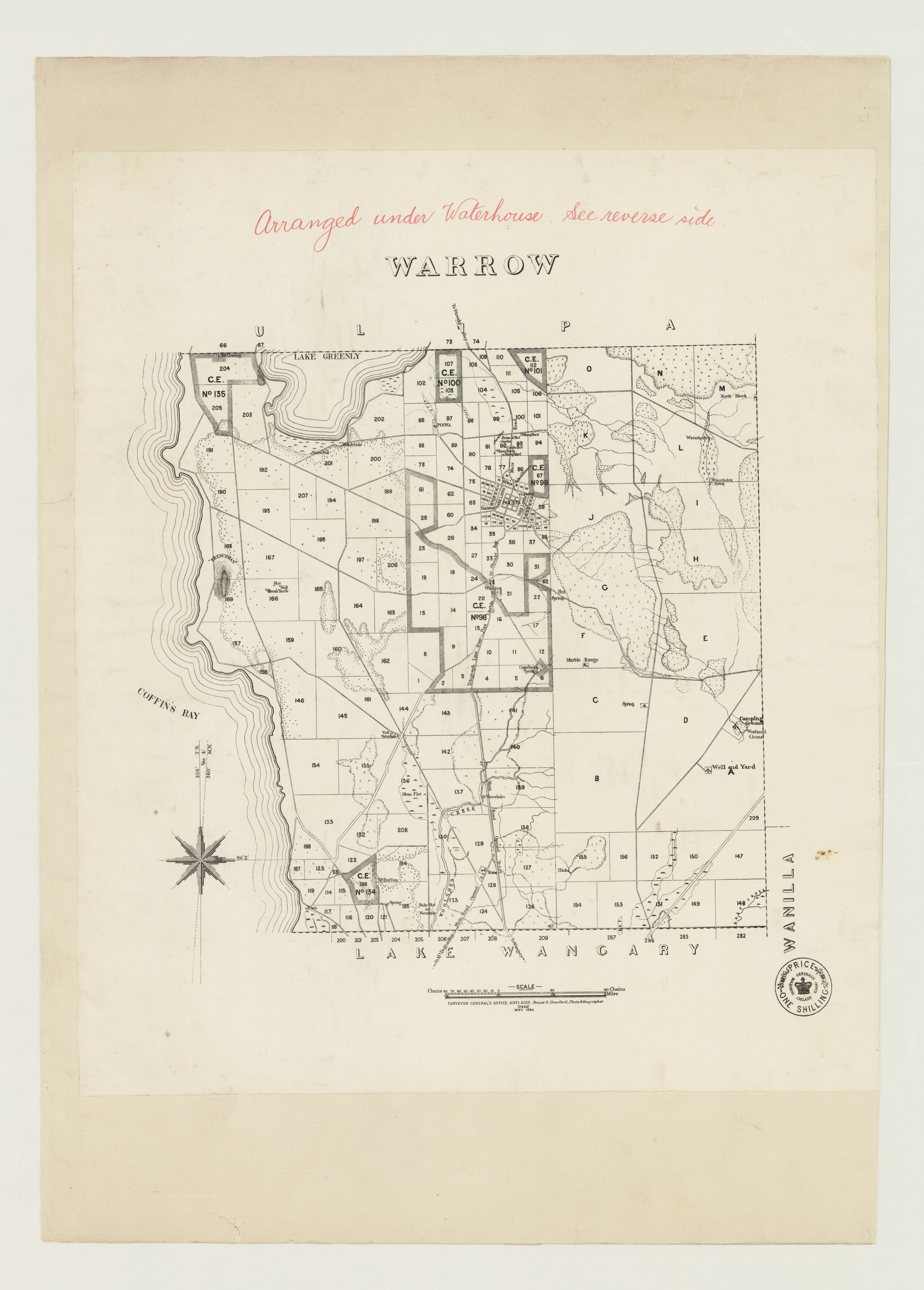
Hundred of Warrow, 1884.

The Hundred of Warrow is a cadastral hundred of the County of Flinders, South Australia. The hundred was proclaimed in 1869. It is bisected east from west by the Flinders Highway, north of Port Lincoln. The main centre of population in the hundred is the town of Coulta. The traditional owners are the Nauo Indigenous Australians.
