= District Council of Lower Eyre Peninsula =

Coordinates: 34°20′S 135°30′E

Lower Eyre Council
- Local government area
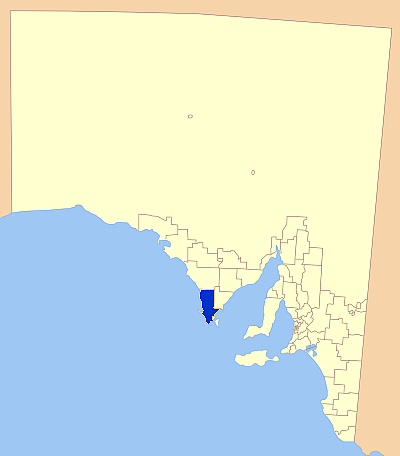
- Location of the Lower Eyre Council

- Interactive map of Lower Eyre Council
- Country: Australia
- State: South Australia
- Region: Eyre Western
- Established: 1 July 1880
- Council seat: Cummins

Government
  - Mayor: Jo-Anne Quigley
  - State electorate: Flinders
  - Federal division: Grey

Area
  - Total: 4,771 km^{2} (1,842 sq mi)

Population
  - Total: 5,910 (LGA 2021)
- Website: Lower Eyre Council
LGAs around Lower Eyre Council
Southern Ocean	District Council of Elliston	District Council of Tumby Bay
Southern Ocean	Lower Eyre Council	City of Port Lincoln
Southern Ocean	Southern Ocean	Spencer Gulf

The Lower Eyre Council is a local government area located on Eyre Peninsula in South Australia. The district covers the southern tip of the peninsula, except for the small area taken up by the City of Port Lincoln.

The main council offices are in Cummins, with a branch office in Port Lincoln, even though Port Lincoln is actually in its own council area, not encompassed by the council.

== History ==
The District Council of Lower Eyre Peninsula traces its history back to 1880 when a district council was first created for the Port Lincoln area. The District Council of Lincoln was established in on 1 July 1880. Its boundaries were exactly those of the Hundred of Lincoln and included Boston and Grantham islands. Council members, listed as "Messrs. William Brooke Carlin, Gustave Möller, John Garrett, Henry Walter Owen, and Robert Duddlestone", first met at the Pier Hotel in July of that year and William Carlin was elected chairman. The new district council was greatly expanded less than eight years later by the enactment of the District Councils Act 1887 which saw the boundaries of the district extended to cover the entire County of Flinders (southern Eyre Peninsula up to a line north of Cummins) in January 1888. The boundaries were extended again in 1890 when it gained the hundreds of Kiana, Mitchell and Shannon to the north in the County of Musgrave.

In 1906, the north east of the district was removed to form the new District Council of Tumby Bay and, in 1921, Port Lincoln itself was severed to create the Corporate Town of Port Lincoln. The district regained an area from the Corporate Town in 1935 and, in 1936, the District Council of Lincoln controlled thirteen hundreds, amounting to approximately 1,300,000 acres; its population in that year was estimated at 1,486. The district boundaries underwent further alterations in 1981 and 1982. In 1988, it assumed its current name when the District Council of Lincoln was renamed the District Council of Lower Eyre Peninsula.

== Economy ==
The area's economy is reliant mostly on agriculture, with cereal crops and sheep being prominent in the district, as in much of the Eyre Peninsula. Fishing and aquaculture are a large part of the economy also, with Coffin Bay Oysters gaining statewide recognition.

The district, particularly coastal towns such as Coffin Bay are ever popular with tourists, with fishing and a variety of other water based activities a major attraction. The Coffin Bay National Park is also a major attraction, as well as an area of natural habitat conservation.

== Localities ==
The district has two major towns; Cummins and Coffin Bay, but the district covers a large area, including a large number of rural localities: Boston, Charlton Gully, Coomunga, Coulta, Duck Ponds, Edillilie, Farm Beach, Fountain, Green Patch, Hawson, Kapinnie, Karkoo, Kellidie Bay, Kiana, Lincoln National Park, Little Douglas, Louth Bay, Mitchell, Mount Drummond, Mount Dutton Bay, Mount Hope, North Shields, Pearlah, Point Boston, Poonindie, Sleaford, Tiatukia, Tootenilla, Tulka, Uley, Wangary, Wanilla, Whites Flat, Whites River, and Yeelanna, and part of Port Lincoln.

== Councillors ==
Ward	Councillor	Notes
Unsubdivided	John Isle	Deputy Mayor
Unsubdivided	Isaac Taylor	
Unsubdivided	Brett Howell	
Unsubdivided	Steve Woolley	
Unsubdivided	Neville Trezise	
Unsubdivided	Peter Mitchell	
Unsubdivided	Jo-Ann Quigley	Mayor

== Chairmen and mayors ==
- James O'Shanahan (1902–1904, 1914–1938)
- William Germain Morgan (1938-1949)
- Percival (Barney) Woods (1949-1957)
- Richard Baxter Stuart Sinclair (1957-1970)
- Clifford Philip Morgan (1970-1974)
- Victor Lewis Gerschwitz (1974–1975)
- Thomas George Secker (1975–1981)
- John Francis Hayman (1981–1985)
- Max Hill (2006–2009)
- Julie Low (2009–present)
- Jo-Ann Quigley (2018–Present)

== See also ==
- Port Lincoln Airport
