= Kellidie Bay, South Australia =

Kellidie Bay South Australia
- Coordinates: 34°35′18″S 135°28′08″E
- Population: 21 (SAL 2021)
- Established: 16 October 2003
- Postcode(s): 5607
- Time zone: ACST (UTC+9:30)
  - Summer (DST): ACST (UTC+10:30)
- Location: 290 km (180 mi) west of Adelaide; 42 km (26 mi) south-west of Cummins
- LGA(s): District Council of Lower Eyre Peninsula
- Region: Eyre Western
- County: Flinders
- State electorate(s): Flinders
- Federal division(s): Grey
Mean max temp	Mean min temp	Annual rainfall
21.3 °C; 70 °F	11.4 °C; 53 °F	394.6 mm 15.5 in
Suburbs around Kellidie Bay:
Coffin Bay (body of water)	Wangary	Wangary
Coffin Bay (body of water)	Kellidie Bay	Wangary
Coffin Bay (body of water)	Coffin Bay (body of water)	Coffin Bay
- Footnotes: Locations; Adjoining localities

Kellidie Bay is a locality in the Australian state of South Australia located on the Eyre Peninsula in the state’s west overlooking parts of the body of water known as Coffin Bay about 290 kilometres (180 mi) west of the state capital of Adelaide and about 42 kilometres (26 mi) south-west of the municipal seat of Cummins.

Its boundaries were created on 16 October 2003 for the "long established name" and includes the former “Shelley Beach Shack Site, formerly known as Kellidie Bay Shack Site, also spelt Kelledie Bay.”

Kellidie Bay occupies land on the west, north and east sides of the body of water known as Kellidie Bay which is a subsidiary of Coffin Bay. It includes all of the Kellidie Peninsula, a peninsula which extends in a north-south direction from the mainland before turning west thereby partially separating Kellidie Bay from the following parts of Coffin Bay - Mount Dutton Bay in the north, Port Douglas to the west.

The locality contains a settlement consisting of permanent dwellings located on the east side of the Kellidie Peninsula overlooking Kellidie Bay.

Land use within the locality consists of five separate zonings. Firstly, a ‘coastal conservation’ zone occupying all of its coastline. Secondly, land associated with the settlement is zoned for ‘coastal settlement’ where the desired character is to encourage development involving low-rise detached dwellings. Thirdly, some land in its north is zoned for ‘aquaculture’ for the provision of “land-based facilities for marine-based aquaculture farms” located within the Kellidie Bay water body. Finally, the remainder of the land in the north being zoned either as ‘Primary Production’ or for ‘Water Protection’ in respect to the management of the aquifer system existing under land within the southern end of the Eyre Peninsula. The Kellidie Bay Conservation Park occupies land in the locality's south-east corner.

Kellidie Bay is located within the federal division of Grey, the state electoral district of Flinders and the local government area of the District Council of Lower Eyre Peninsula.
