= Edillilie, South Australia =

Edillilie South Australia
- Coordinates: 34.411°S 135.706°E
- Population: 129 (SAL 2021)
- Established: 1908
- Postcode(s): 5630
- Elevation: 72 m (236 ft)
- Location: 48 km (30 mi) north of Port Lincoln; 17 km (11 mi) south of Cummins
- LGA(s): District Council of Lower Eyre Peninsula
- Region: Eyre Western
- County: Flinders
- State electorate(s): Flinders
- Federal division(s): Grey
Localities around Edillilie:
	Cummins	Yallunda Flat
Coulta	Edillilie	Koppio
Wangary	Wanilla

Edillilie is a small town on Eyre Peninsula in South Australia. It is on the Tod Highway and Eyre Peninsula Railway north of Port Lincoln.

The town was named after Edillilie Creek. The railway station was originally named Mortlock Siding. It still has bulk grain silos, however passenger service ended many years ago. The grain silos are serviced by Viterra.

Edillilie is located within the federal Division of Grey, the state electoral district of Flinders and the local government area of the District Council of Lower Eyre Peninsula.

== See also ==
- List of cities and towns in South Australia
