= Whites Flat, South Australia =

Whites Flat
- Town
- Coordinates: 34.512202°S 135.853239°E
- Country: Australia
- State: South Australia
- Region: Eyre Western
- LGA: District Council of Lower Eyre Peninsula

Government
  - State electorate: Flinders
  - Federal division: Grey

Population
  - Total: 54 (SAL 2021)
- Postcode: 5607
- County: Flinders
Localities around Whites Flat
Koppio	Koppio	Koppio
Wanilla	Whites Flat	Whites River; Louth Bay
Charlton Gully	Charlton Gully	Poonindie

Whites Flat (also known as White Flat) is a rural locality in the Eyre and Western region of South Australia, situated within the District Council of Lower Eyre Peninsula. The boundaries for the locality were formally established in October 2003 for the long established local name; this had originally been named after pastoralist Samuel White.

The main feature of the locality is the Tod Reservoir. It also contains the Tucknott Scrub Conservation Park, which lies in its north-west corner.

Whites Flat Post Office opened on 1 October 1897. In 1915, Whites Flat was described as consisting of a post office and local hall, the latter simultaneously serving as school, church, dance hall and lecture room, for less than a dozen inhabitants. The hall had been built by the local residents with their own labour. The school survived for several decades; in 1942, air raid trenches were dug for the students. In 1950, it was reported that "the tiny little post office at White Flat remains unchanged" and that the writer "would be sorry to see the day of the demolition of this little thatch-roofed place which stands a sentinel of the early days".

The post office at Whites Flat is long closed; however, the building, reputed to be the "smallest post office in Australia" survives, having been relocated to the National Trust of South Australia-owned Koppio Smithy Museum in adjacent Koppio. The White Flat Community Hall remains open to the community today.

== Notable residents ==
- John Chapman, first Country Party member of the South Australian House of Assembly

== See also ==
- List of cities and towns in South Australia
