= Poonindie, South Australia =

Poonindie
- Town
- Coordinates: 34.58126250°S 135.88101325°E
- Country: Australia
- State: South Australia
- Region: Eyre Western
- LGA: District Council of Lower Eyre Peninsula
- Location: 251 km (156 mi) W of Adelaide city centre; 15 km (9.3 mi) N of Port Lincoln
- Established: 1850

Government
  - State electorate: Flinders
  - Federal division: Grey

Population
  - Total: 210 (SAL 2021)
- Time zone: UTC+9:30 (ACST)
  - Summer (DST): UTC+10:30 (ACST)
- Postcode: 5607
- County: Flinders
- Mean max temp: 21.2 °C (70.2 °F)
- Mean min temp: 11.3 °C (52.3 °F)
- Annual rainfall: 383.2 mm (15.09 in)
Localities around Poonindie
Whites Flat	Whites Flat; Louth Bay	Louth Bay
Charlton Gully	Poonindie	Spencer Gulf
North Shields	North Shields	Spencer Gulf
- Location; Climate; Adjoining localities

Poonindie is a small township near Port Lincoln on the Eyre Peninsula, South Australia. The township is situated in the historic Country of the Nauo People (an Australian Indigenous community), though it is within the modern governmentally recognised territorial borders of the Barngarla People.

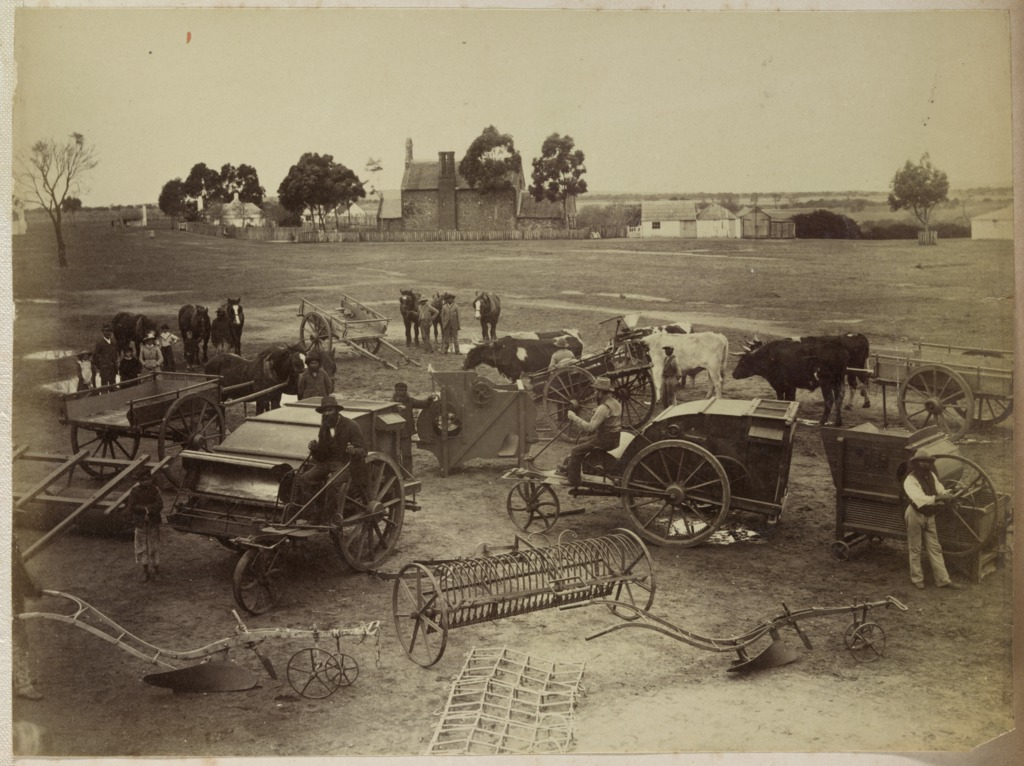
Poonindie Mission, 1886 by Samuel Sweet.

Poonindie Mission was established as a mission for Aboriginal people in South Australia in 1850, at the instigation of the first Archdeacon of Adelaide, Mathew Hale, who also served as superintendent for several years. St Matthew's church, built in 1854-55 and originally intended to be the school, served both the mission and the local community. It survives and remains in use today. Hale ran the Aboriginal Training Institution at the mission. His friend, the Anglican Archbishop of Adelaide, Augustus Short, visited the mission, which prospered.

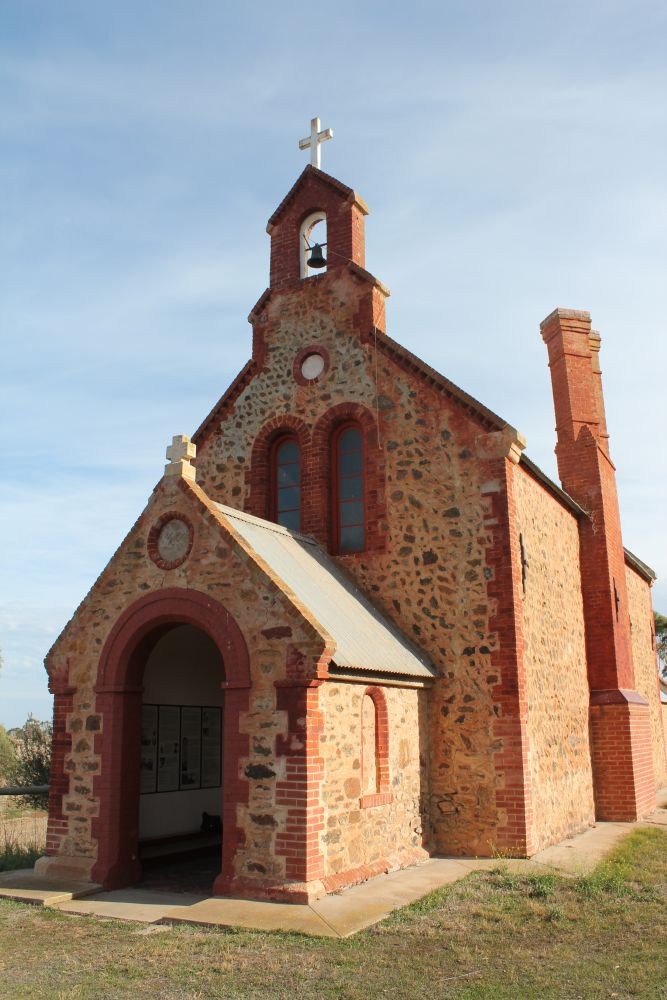
Church of St Matthew, Poonindie, Port Lincoln.

The mission closed after 44 years, after which the land was divided and sold, with just St Matthew's and a small area of land remaining the property of the Anglican Church. 300 acres (120 ha) of land became an Aboriginal reserve when the Mission closed in 1894. Most of the residents were moved to Point Pearce and Point McLeay missions, while others moved to the nearby Aboriginal reserve, but a small number of residents remained on the mission site until the 1910s.

The institution is named in the Bringing Them Home report, as one which housed Indigenous children forcibly removed from their parents and thus creating the Stolen Generations.

The former reserve is now an Aboriginal self-managed Aboriginal community called Akenta, run by Akenta Incorporated.

Pooonindie Uniting Church lies to the north of the township.

== Heritage listings ==
Poonindie has a number of sites associated with the former mission listed on the South Australian Heritage Register, including:

- Poonindie Mission Bakehouse Complex and Well
- Poonindie Mission Superintendent's Residence
- Poonindie Cemetery
- Poonindie Mission Schoolhouse
- St Matthew's Anglican Church

== See also ==
- Eyre Peninsula bushfire

=== Other 19th-century Aboriginal missions in SA ===
- Killalpaninna
- Koonibba
- Point McLeay
- Point Pearce
