= Tod River Dam =

Dam and reservoir in South Australia

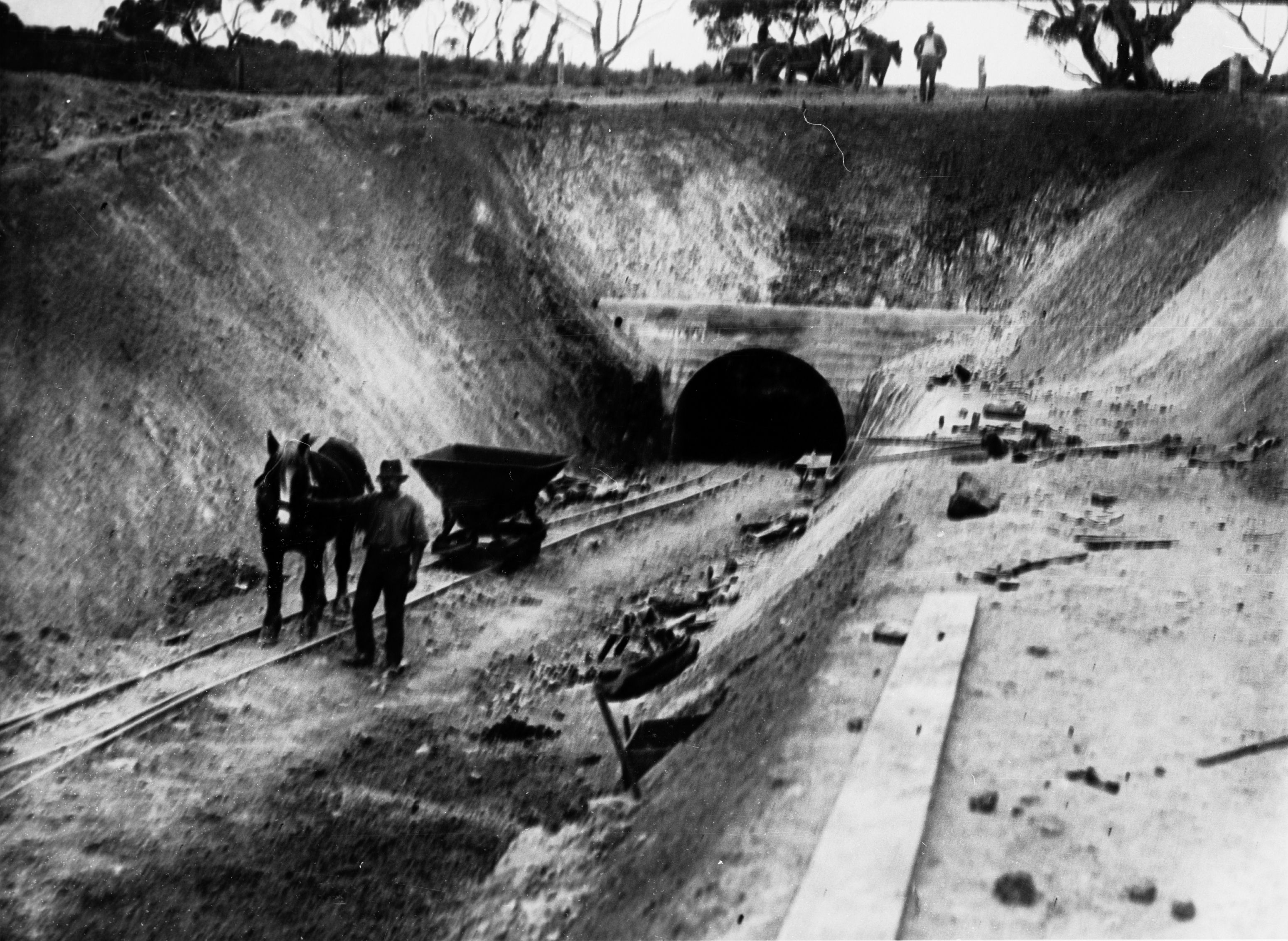
- Construction of the dam's water culvert through the hills using a horse-drawn light railway, c. 1915

- Location of the dam in South Australia
- Interactive map of Tod River Dam
- Country: Australia
- Location: Eyre Peninsula, South Australia
- Coordinates: 34°29′12″S 135°51′05″E
- Purpose: Water supply
- Status: Operational
- Construction began: 1918
- Opening date: 1922
- Construction cost: A$562,000
- Owner: Government of South Australia
- Operator: SA Water

Dam and spillways
- Type of dam: Earth fill dam
- Impounds: Off stream
- Height (foundation): 25 m (82 ft)
- Length: 351 m (1,152 ft)
- Dam volume: 263×10^{3} m^{3} (9.3×10^{6} cu ft)
- Spillway type: Uncontrolled
- Spillway capacity: 155 m^{3}/s (5,500 cu ft/s)

Reservoir
- Creates: Tod River Reservoir
- Total capacity: 11.3 GL (9,200 acre⋅ft)
- Catchment area: 40 km^{2} (15 sq mi)
- Surface area: 134 ha (330 acres)
- Normal elevation: 112 m (367 ft) AHD
- Website sawater.com.au

South Australian Heritage Register
- Official name: Tod Reservoir
- Type: Utilities - Reservoir
- Designated: 4 March 1993
- Reference no.: 16602

The Tod River Dam is an off-stream earth-filled embankment dam, located near Whites Flat and Koppio, 27 kilometres (17 mi) north of Port Lincoln, on the Eyre Peninsula in South Australia. Completed in 1922, the resultant reservoir, the Tod River Reservoir, more commonly known as the Tod Reservoir, was established for the supply of potable water for settlements on the Peninsula. The reservoir was added to the South Australian Heritage Register on 4 March 1993.

== Overview ==
Located off-stream, the inflow to the reservoir is supplied by concrete channels fed from weirs constructed across the Tod River, the only stream on Eyre Peninsula providing reliable flows, and its major tributary, the Pillaworta Creek.

The earth-fill dam wall is 25 metres (82 ft) high and 351 metres (1,152 ft) long. When full, the reservoir has capacity for 11.3 gigalitres (9,200 acre⋅ft) and covers 134 hectares (330 acres), drawn from a catchment area of 40 square kilometres (15 sq mi). The uncontrolled spillway has a flow capacity of 155 cubic metres per second (5,500 cu ft/s).

=== Reservoir use ===
The catchment yield for the Tod River is estimated to be 11 gigalitres (8,900 acre⋅ft) per annum, though this can reduce significantly during periods of drought.

For some years up to 3,000 megalitres (2,400 acre⋅ft) of potable water was extracted annually from the reservoir. However, negligible water was extracted since 2001–2002. Some of the reasons for the change included increasing salinity and concerns about the levels of agricultural chemicals in the reservoir. The reservoir was retained as a ‘contingency' water supply measure since that time.

In April 2011, the Department for Water listed three possible options for the future use of the Tod Reservoir. They were:

1. Catchment rehabilitation to improve the health of the Tod Reservoir and the quality of its inflows
2. Potential recreational use
3. Decommissioning and removing the dam wall

There was widespread support in the Eyre Peninsula community for recommissioning the Tod Reservoir using desalination. SA Water investigated this option and concluded it was not viable because of the difficulty in finding an environmentally suitable location for brine waste disposal. SA Water also concluded there was insufficient volume of water available in the reservoir to justify desalination. Alternative views exist, with others suggesting that desalination could be viable with some further engineering and catchment management considerations.

In 2013, the reservoir's future was the topic of debate in Parliament, including speculation over its use by Centrex Metals, an iron ore mining company.

== History ==
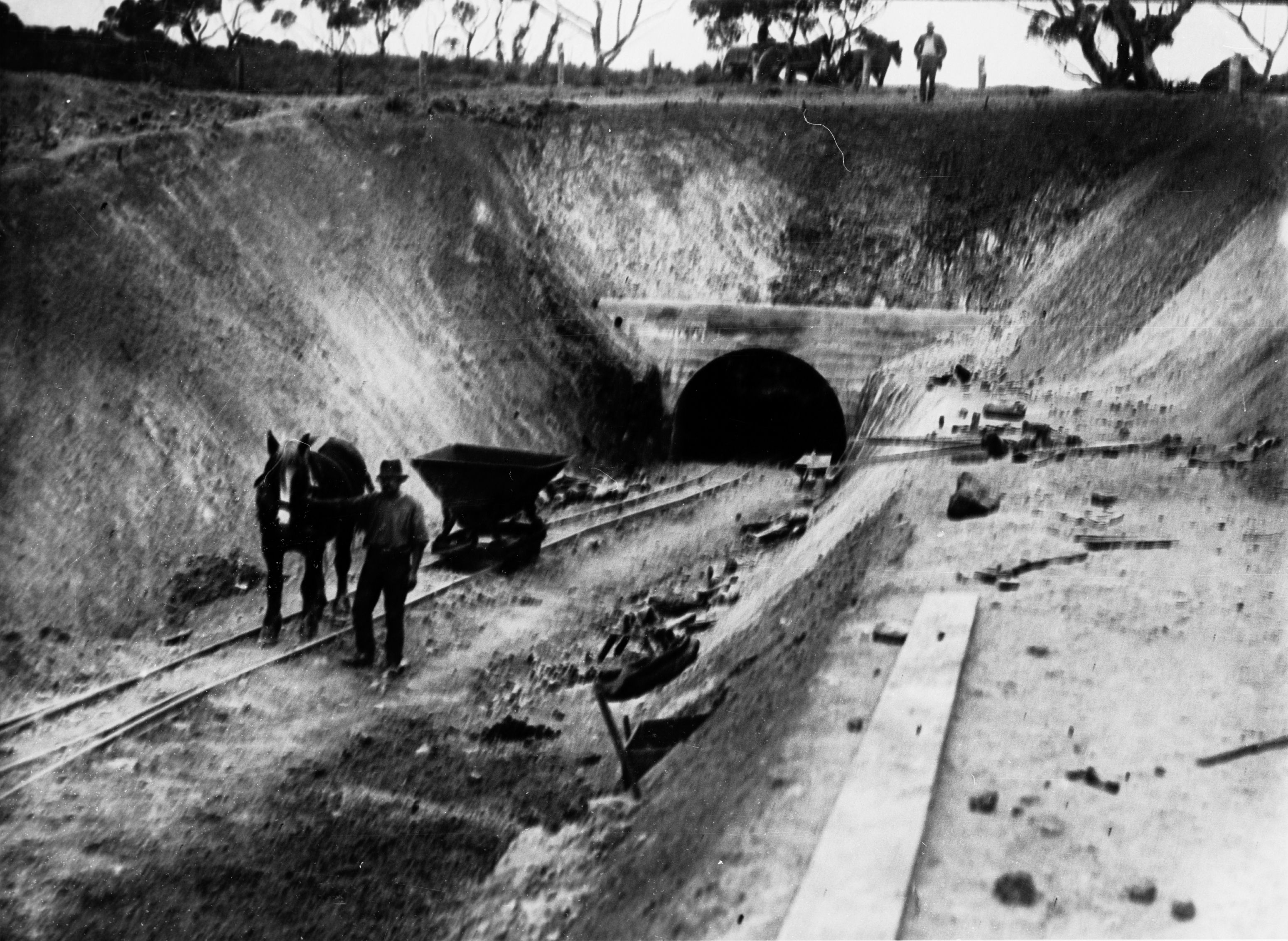

Mr C. A. Bayer presented the merits of a dam on the Tod River to the Royal Commission in 1916. An earth embankment dam was built on the Tod River between 1918 and 1922 at a cost of A$562,000. In 1921, 600 men were employed on the project. The reservoir overflowed for the first time in August 1932. The water level reached its lowest point in its history in 1949. Low water problems persisted in 1950. In 1951, new pumps were installed at the reservoir.

Seven people died during the dam's construction. In late 1918, three men were killed in a cave-in. Another four died in two separate blasting accidents in 1921. In 1982, a memorial to all seven men was erected at the picnic area near the embankment.

== Museum and recreational facilities ==
A museum which features audio and visual displays is located off White Flat Road, northwest of Poonindie. Grounds include a playground, tennis court, coin-operated barbecues and a picnic area. Grounds are open 7 days. The museum is open Monday to Friday, from 9am to 4pm.

In September 2014, it was reported that the Tod River Reservoir would open to recreational fishing and be stocked with "recreationally attractive species." The change was expected to occur within the 2014-2015 financial year.

== See also ==
- List of reservoirs and dams in South Australia
- List of parks and gardens in rural South Australia
