= John Fitzgerald (tennis) =

Australian tennis player

- Full name: John Basil Fitzgerald
- Country (sports): Australia
- Residence: Melbourne, Victoria
- Born: 28 December 1960 (age 65) Cummins, South Australia
- Height: 6 ft 0 in (1.83 m)
- Turned pro: 1980
- Retired: 1997
- Plays: Right-handed (one-handed backhand)
- Prize money: $3,207,272

Singles
- Career record: 240–231
- Career titles: 6
- Highest ranking: No. 25 (11 July 1988)

Grand Slam singles results
- Australian Open: 4R (1983)
- French Open: 2R (1983, 1986)
- Wimbledon: 4R (1981, 1986, 1989)
- US Open: 3R (1984)

Other tournaments
- Olympic Games: 1R (1988)

Doubles
- Career record: 498–287
- Career titles: 30
- Highest ranking: No. 1 (8 July 1991)

Grand Slam doubles results
- Australian Open: W (1982)
- French Open: W (1986, 1991)
- Wimbledon: W (1989, 1991)
- US Open: W (1984, 1991)

Other doubles tournaments
- Tour Finals: W (1991)
- Olympic Games: 2R (1988, 1992)

Grand Slam mixed doubles results
- Wimbledon: W (1991)
- US Open: W (1983)

Team competitions
- Davis Cup: W (1983, 1986)

John Basil Fitzgerald OAM (born 28 December 1960) is a former professional tennis player from Australia who played right-handed with a single-handed backhand.

== Playing career ==
During his career, he won 6 top-tier singles titles and 30 tour doubles titles, including 7 Grand Slam doubles titles. He also achieved the career men's doubles Grand Slam (winning all four titles-the Australian Open, French Open, Wimbledon and the US Open). He reached the World No. 1 doubles ranking in 1991, teaming up with Anders Järryd to win three out of the four Grand Slam doubles titles that year. His career-high singles ranking was World No. 25 in 1988. He was a member of the Australian team which won the Davis Cup in 1983 and 1986.

== Post-playing career ==
Fitzgerald was the captain of the Australian Davis Cup Team from 2001 to 2010, leading the team to a tournament victory in 2003 against Spain.

== Honours ==
Fitzgerald was awarded the Medal of the Order of Australia in 1993. On Australia Day in 2020, John was inducted into the Australian Tennis Hall of Fame.

== Grand Slam finals ==
=== Doubles (7 titles, 4 runners-up) ===
Result	Year	Championship	Surface	Partner	Opponents	Score
Win	1982	Australian Open	Grass	(Australia) John Alexander	(United States) Andy Andrews (United States) John Sadri	6–7, 6–2, 7–6
Win	1984	US Open	Hard	(Czech Republic) Tomáš Šmíd	(Sweden) Stefan Edberg (Sweden) Anders Järryd	7–6, 6–3, 6–3
Loss	1985	Wimbledon	Grass	(Australia) Pat Cash	(Switzerland) Heinz Günthardt (Hungary) Balázs Taróczy	4–6, 3–6, 6–4, 3–6
Win	1986	French Open	Clay	(Czech Republic) Tomáš Šmíd	(Sweden) Stefan Edberg (Sweden) Anders Järryd	6–3, 4–6, 6–3, 6–7, 14–12
Loss	1988	French Open	Clay	(Sweden) Anders Järryd	(Ecuador) Andrés Gómez (Spain) Emilio Sánchez	3–6, 7–6, 4–6, 3–6
Loss	1988	Wimbledon	Grass	(Sweden) Anders Järryd	(United States) Ken Flach (United States) Robert Seguso	4–6, 6–2, 4–6, 6–7
Win	1989	Wimbledon	Grass	(Sweden) Anders Järryd	(United States) Rick Leach (United States) Jim Pugh	3–6, 7–6, 6–4, 7–6
Win	1991	French Open	Clay	(Sweden) Anders Järryd	(United States) Rick Leach (United States) Jim Pugh	6–0, 7–6
Win	1991	Wimbledon	Grass	(Sweden) Anders Järryd	(Argentina) Javier Frana (Mexico) Leonardo Lavalle	6–3, 6–4, 6–7, 6–1
Win	1991	US Open	Hard	(Sweden) Anders Järryd	(United States) Scott Davis (United States) David Pate	6–3, 3–6, 6–3, 6–3
Loss	1993	Australian Open	Hard	(Sweden) Anders Järryd	(South Africa) Danie Visser (Australia) Laurie Warder	4–6, 3–6, 4–6

=== Mixed doubles (2 titles, 4 runners-up) ===
Result	Year	Championship	Surface	Partner	Opponents	Score
Win	1983	US Open	Hard	(Australia) Elizabeth Sayers	(United States) Barbara Potter (United States) Ferdi Taygan	3–6, 6–3, 6–4
Loss	1984	US Open	Hard	(Australia) Elizabeth Sayers	(Bulgaria) Manuela Maleeva (United States) Tom Gullikson	6–2, 5–7, 4–6
Loss	1985	Wimbledon	Grass	(Australia) Elizabeth Smylie	(United States) Martina Navratilova (Australia) Paul McNamee	5–7, 6–4, 2–6
Loss	1985	US Open	Hard	(Australia) Elizabeth Smylie	(United States) Martina Navratilova (Switzerland) Heinz Günthardt	3–6, 4–6
Loss	1990	Wimbledon	Grass	(Australia) Elizabeth Smylie	(United States) Zina Garrison (United States) Rick Leach	5–7, 2–6
Win	1991	Wimbledon	Grass	(Australia) Elizabeth Smylie	(Soviet Union) Natasha Zvereva (United States) Jim Pugh	7–6^{(7–4)}, 6–2
