= North Shields, South Australia =

North Shields
- Town
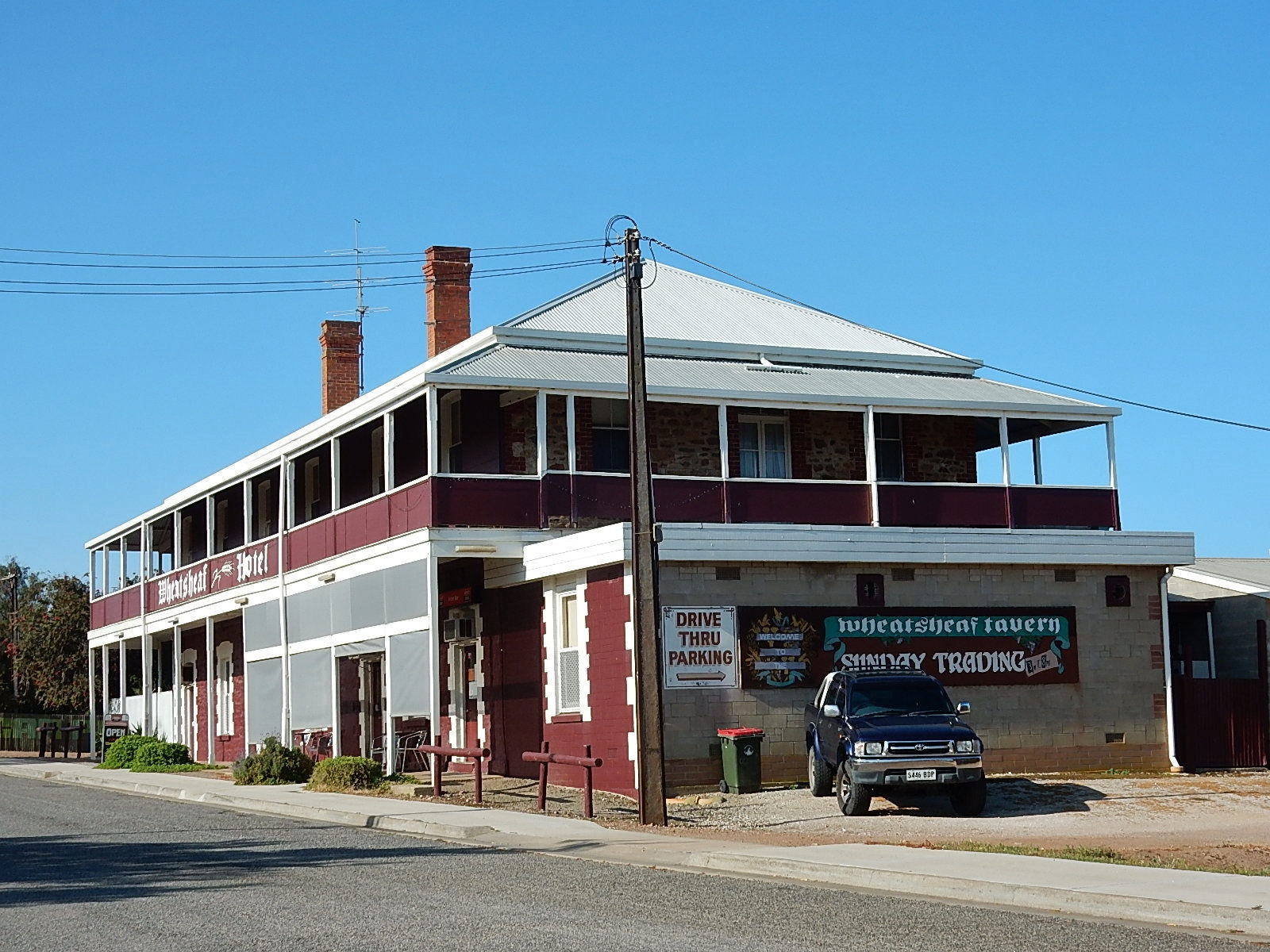
- Wheatsheaf Hotel

- Coordinates: 34°37′48″S 135°51′47″E
- Country: Australia
- State: South Australia
- LGA: District Council of Lower Eyre Peninsula
- Location: 252 km (157 mi) from Adelaide

Government
  - State electorate: Flinders
  - Federal division: Grey

Population
  - Total: 338 (SAL 2021)
- Time zone: UTC+9:30 (ACST)
  - Summer (DST): UTC+10:30 (ACST)
- Postcode: 5607
Localities around North Shields
Charlton Gully	Poonindie	Poonindie; Spencer Gulf
Green Patch	North Shields	Spencer Gulf; Point Boston
Tootenilla	Tiatukia	Spencer Gulf

North Shields is a town on the east coast of Eyre Peninsula, overlooking Boston Bay in Spencer Gulf in South Australia. It is 11 km (6.8 mi) north of Port Lincoln.

The Lincoln Highway runs north-south through the town. Port Lincoln Airport is located at North Shields, close to its boundary with Point Boston. A postal receiving office at North Shields opened on 13 August 1908. It was upgraded to a post office in April 1910, but from 2 April 1993 has existed as a Community Postal Agent operating out of the Port Lincoln Caravan Park on Lincoln Highway.

North Shields formerly had a primary school; however, this closed, and the Port Lincoln Lions Club Hostel was built on the old school site in 1973.

There was a Lutheran Aboriginal mission at North Shields from 1849 to 1853. It was associated with Reverend Clamor Wilhelm Schuermann, who had previously published a dictionary of the local Parnkalla language in 1844. Schuermann moved to the Western District of Victoria in 1853, and the mission was closed and its residents sent to the Anglican mission at Poonindie. The surviving remnants of the mission are listed on the South Australian Heritage Register as C. W. Schuermann's Mission Site.

== See also ==
- Eyre Peninsula bushfire
