= Coulta, South Australia =

Coulta Gulda (Nauo) South Australia
- Coordinates: 34°23′12″S 135°28′01″E
- Population: 213 (SAL 2021)
- Established: 18 October 1877 (town); 15 October 2009 (locality)
- Postcode(s): 5607
- Time zone: ACST (UTC+9:30)
  - Summer (DST): ACST (UTC+10:30)
- Location: 293 km (182 mi) W of Adelaide; 60 km (37 mi) NW of Port Lincoln
- LGA(s): District Council of Lower Eyre Peninsula
- Region: Eyre Western
- County: Flinders
- State electorate(s): Flinders
- Federal division(s): Grey
Mean max temp	Mean min temp	Annual rainfall
23.1 °C; 74 °F	9.9 °C; 50 °F	427.3 mm 16.8 in
Localities around Coulta:
Great Australian Bight	Mount Drummond; Cummins	Cummins
Great Australian Bight; Farm Beach	Coulta	Cummins; Edillilie; Wangary
Farm Beach,	Little Douglas; Mount Dutton Bay; Wangary	Wangary
- Footnotes: Adjoining localities

Coulta (Nauo: Gulda) is a town and locality in the Australian state of South Australia located about 293 kilometres (182 mi) west of the state capital of Adelaide and about 60 kilometres (37 mi) north-west of the municipal seat in Port Lincoln.

The township is adjacent to the Flinders Highway, and the bounded locality extends to the coast on the western side of the peninsula, facing the Great Australian Bight. Coulta was named in 1877, derived from a 'native name of a spring "Koolta"'.

Coulta is located within the federal division of Grey, the state electoral district of Flinders and the local government area of the District Council of Lower Eyre Peninsula.

== History ==
The traditional owners of the district were the Nauo Indigenous Australians.
