= Koppio =

- Town
- Coordinates: 34°25′18″S 135°50′48″E
- Country: Australia
- State: South Australia
- Region: Eyre Western
- LGA: District Council of Tumby Bay
- Location: 256 km (159 mi) W of Adelaide; 32 km (20 mi) N of Port Lincoln
- Established: 1998

Government
  - State electorate: Flinders
  - Federal division: Grey

Population
  - Total: 61 (2021 census)
- Time zone: UTC+9:30 (ACST)
  - Summer (DST): UTC+10:30 (ACST)
- Postcode: 5607
- County: Flinders
- Mean max temp: 21.3 °C (70.3 °F)
- Mean min temp: 11.4 °C (52.5 °F)
- Annual rainfall: 393.9 mm (15.51 in)
Localities around Koppio
Edillilie	Yallunda Flat	Tumby Bay
Edillilie	Koppio	Tumby Bay
Wanilla	Whites Flat; Whites River	Whites River
- Locations; Adjoining localities

Koppio is a locality in the Australian state of South Australia located on the Eyre Peninsula about 256 kilometres (159 mi) west of the state capital of Adelaide and about 32 kilometres (20 mi) north of Port Lincoln, and within the Tod River catchment area, Southern Australia While long-established agricultural activities dominate (including sheep, cattle and buffalo grazing and wheat cropping) the region is also prospective for graphite and iron ore. The Koppio Smithy Museum is a local tourist attraction replete with buildings and artifacts representing the early pioneer heritage of Eyre Peninsula.

== Mining and mineral exploration ==
Companies actively exploring the area early in the 21st century included Eyre Iron Pty Ltd (a joint venture of Centrex Metals) and Lincoln Minerals. Eyre Iron's proposed Fusion Magnetite Project was the most advanced prospective mine development project in the area. Graphite was first mined in the area in 1866. The Koppio Graphite Mine originally operated in the early 1900s and was revisited between 1941 and 1944.

== Koppio Smithy Museum ==
The Koppio Smithy Museum is a 2.5 acres (1.0 ha) property managed by the National Trust of South Australia which features a collection of early colonial buildings and heritage artifacts collected from across Eyre Peninsula. The entrance is via the old Smithy's cottage, constructed by Tom Brennand after he migrated to the region from Lochiel in 1903. One of the museum's oddities is a replica World War I tank, which was abandoned in the sand dunes of Coffin Bay after its use in the feature film The Lighthorsemen. As of 2014, the museum is open to the public from 10 am until 5 pm Tuesday through Sunday and entry is $10 for adults and $4 for concessions.

=== Exhibits ===
The museum includes the following exhibits:

- Blacksmith shop and two-bedroom cottage (restored)
- 'Glenleigh' thatch cottage (1890)
- Koppio one-teacher schoolhouse (1934 to 1970)
- A unique collection of very early Aboriginal artefacts
- Port Lincoln tailor shop (1910)
- Bank of Adelaide building
- White Flat Post Office (reportedly the smallest Post Office in South Australia),
- Heritage Hall (Jericho family collection)
- Display sheds featuring: tractors & farm machinery, stationary engines, shearing, grain story, hay story, vehicles
- Print Room

== Koppio Cemetery ==
The Koppio Cemetery contains 36 plots, with the earliest grave dating from 1866.

== Governance ==
Koppio is located within the federal Division of Grey, the state electoral district of Flinders and the local government area of the District Council of Tumby Bay.

== See also ==
- List of cities and towns in South Australia
- Hundred of Koppio
