= Coffin Bay =

Coffin Bay Mudhabaga (Nauo)
- Town
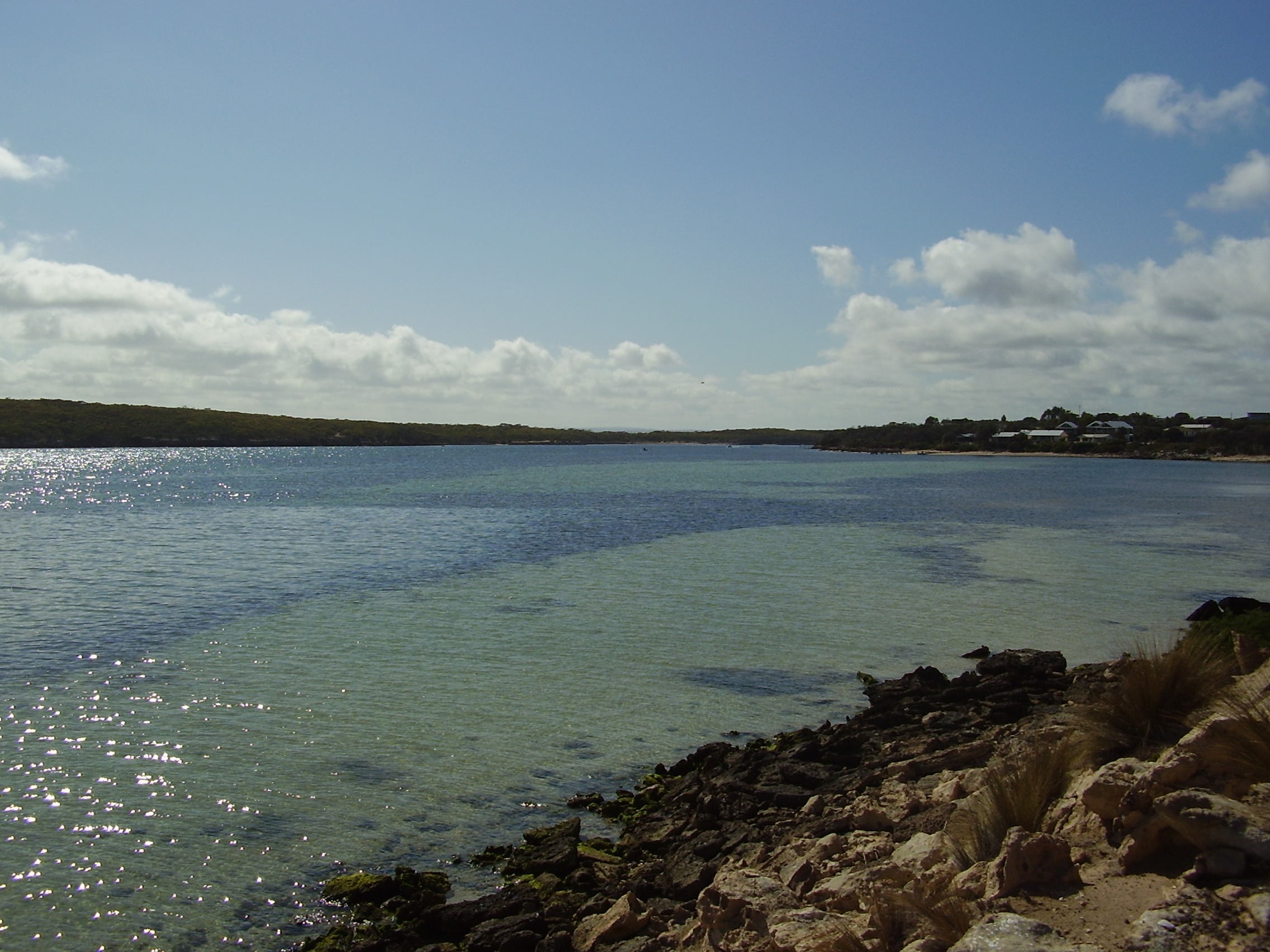
- View down Coffin Bay Channel

- Coordinates: 34°37′28″S 135°28′11″E
- Country: Australia
- State: South Australia
- Region: Eyre Western
- LGA: District Council of Lower Eyre Peninsula
- Location: 288 km (179 mi) W of Adelaide; 36 km (22 mi) W of Port Lincoln
- Established: 1952 ("shack area"); 1957 (private town); 2003 (locality)

Government
  - State electorate: Flinders
  - Federal division: Grey

Population
  - Total: 667 (UCL 2021)
- Time zone: UTC+9:30 (ACST)
  - Summer (DST): UTC+10:30 (ACST)
- Postcode: 5607
- County: Flinders
- Mean max temp: 21.3 °C (70.3 °F)
- Mean min temp: 11.3 °C (52.3 °F)
- Annual rainfall: 389.8 mm (15.35 in)
Localities around Coffin Bay
| Coffin Bay (waterbody) | Wangary | Wangary |
| Coffin Bay (waterbody); Ocean | Coffin Bay | Wangary; Uley |
| Ocean | Ocean; Uley | Uley |

Coffin Bay (Nauo: Mudhabaga), originally Coffin's Bay, is a town at the southern extremity of the Eyre Peninsula, a wheat growing area of South Australia.

The town is situated on the western side of the southern tip of Eyre Peninsula about 46 km from Port Lincoln. The population swells during holiday seasons to more than 4,000 people due to its proximity to the Coffin Bay National Park.

It is a popular location for boating, sailing, swimming, water-skiing, skindiving and wind-surfing, as well as fishing (rock, surf, angling and boat).

The town is named after the bay formed by the Coffin Bay Peninsula and the mainland, and lies on the southeastern shore of the bay. Oyster farming is conducted in the quiet waters of Coffin Bay.

Coffin Bay is in the District Council of Lower Eyre Peninsula local government area, the state electoral district of Flinders and the federal Division of Grey.

== History ==
The indigenous inhabitants of the Coffin Bay area are the Nauo Aboriginal people, who have lived there for tens of thousands of years. Well before the official colonisation of South Australia in 1836, the way of life of the Nauo people had been disrupted by raids carried out by seal hunters, often to kidnap Nauo women.

British naval explorer Matthew Flinders named the bay on 16 February 1802 in honour of his friend Sir Isaac Coffin, who was Resident Naval Commissioner at Sheerness, where HMS Investigator was fitted out. The same year, French explorer Nicolas Baudin provided the alternative French name of Baie Delambre.

The bay remained uncharted until it was explored in March 1839 by Captain Frederick R. Lees (d. 1839), in command of the brig Nereus. Lees' thorough charts became a standard reference for mariners until the electronic era.

In November 1952, and again in October 1955, the state government surveyed a "shack area" on crown land from which allotments were available for leasing. In 1957, the private town of Coffin Bay was laid out by Stanley Germain Morgan on section 132 of the cadastral unit of the Hundred of Lake Wangary.

In 1966, BHP opened the Coffin Bay Tramway, between Port Lincoln and a site 8 kilometres (5 mi) south-east of the town, to convey lime sands. The tramway was closed in 1989, and the track was removed in 2001.

On 16 October 2003, boundaries created for the locality included the full extent of the Coffin Bay Peninsula and the land to the east, bounded in the north in part by the channel connecting to Kellidie Bay and by the Coffin Bay Road, and in the east by the eastern boundary of the Hundred of Lake Wangary. The locality, which was given the "long established name", includes the private town, the Coffin Bay Shack Site and the Coffin Bay National Park.

The historic former Coffin Bay Whaling Site at Point Sir Isaac lies within the locality and is listed on the South Australian Heritage Register.

== See also ==
- Coffin Bay National Park
- Kellidie Bay Conservation Park
- Mount Dutton Bay Conservation Park
