= Hundred of Lake Wangary =

The Hundred of Lake Wangary is a hundred within County of Flinders, South Australia. It is at the southern end of the Eyre Peninsula in South Australia, located 45 kilometres (28 mi) west of Port Lincoln. It is named after the freshwater Lake Wangary.

The traditional owners of the area are the Nauo peoples.

== See also ==
- Lands administrative divisions of South Australia
