= Cummins, South Australia =

Cummins
- Town
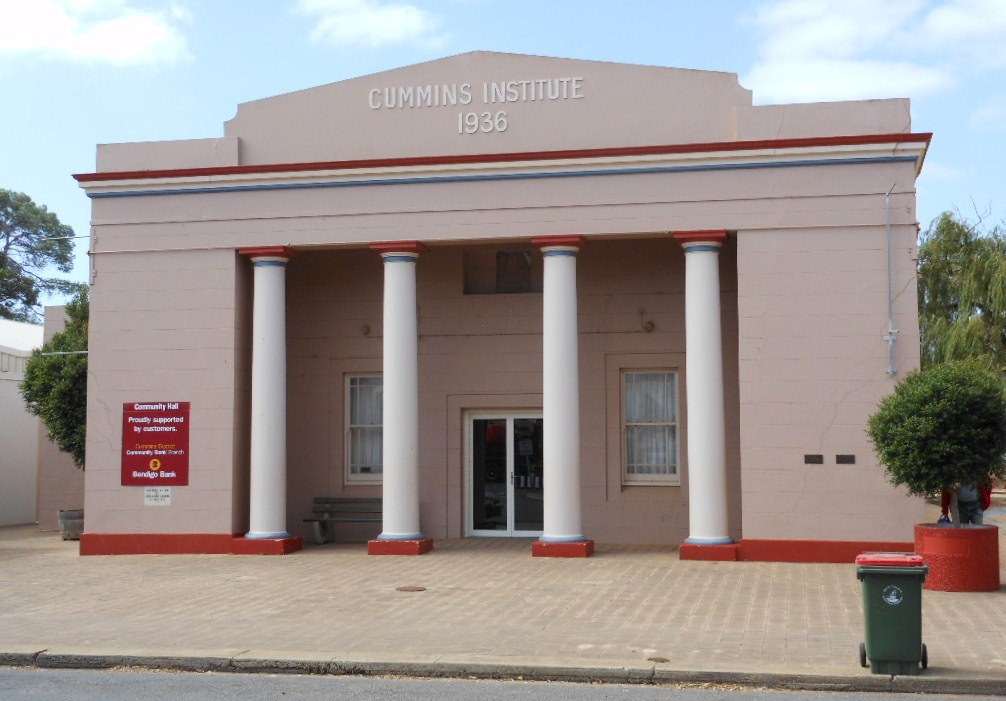
- The Cummins Institute

- Coordinates: 34°15′0″S 135°44′0″E
- Country: Australia
- State: South Australia
- Region: Eyre Western
- LGA: District Council of Lower Eyre Peninsula
- Location: 638 km (396 mi) W of Adelaide; 63 km (39 mi) N of Port Lincoln; 40 km (25 mi) W of Tumby Bay

Government
  - State electorate: Flinders
  - Federal division: Grey
- Elevation: 60 m (200 ft)

Population
  - Total: 748 (UCL 2021)
- Postcode: 5631
- County: Flinders
- Mean max temp: 23.0 °C (73.4 °F)
- Mean min temp: 9.7 °C (49.5 °F)
- Annual rainfall: 415.3 mm (16.35 in)
Localities around Cummins
Kapinnie	Yeelanna	Brooker
Mount Drummond	Cummins	Cockaleechie
Coulta	Edillilie	Yallunda Flat

Cummins is a town on Eyre Peninsula in South Australia, 67 km north of Port Lincoln and 60 m above sea level.

Cummins was named after William Patrick Cummins, a member of the South Australian House of Assembly from 1896 to 1907. The town of Cummins was developed in 1910 a few years after the first settlers in the area arrived. The railway to Port Lincoln arrived in 1907. The bounded locality of Cummins includes the former railway sidings of Pillana (south of the town) and Wildeloo (north of it).

The major industries are sheep farming and cereal grain growing. There was a junction of the narrow gauge Eyre Peninsula Railway within the town. The railway facilitated transfer of grain to the deep-water port at Port Lincoln, primarily for export till operation of the railway was discontinued on 21 May 2019. The Tod Highway and Bratten Way intersect at Cummins. A large grain storage and transshipment facility lies on the southern outskirts of town.

Cummins is the headquarters of the District Council of Lower Eyre Peninsula. It is in the state electoral district of Flinders and the federal Division of Grey.

The town has a bowls club with 3 greens which competes in the Southern Eyre Peninsula Men's Bowling Association.

Cummins is the birthplace of former Australian tennis player John Fitzgerald who in a career spanning 1980-1997 won seven Grand Slam Doubles titles at all four major events (Australian Open (1982), French Open (1986, 1991), Wimbledon (1989, 1991), and the US Open (1984, 1991)).

The Traditional custodians of the district were the Nawu people.

== Climate ==
Cummins has a hot-summer mediterranean climate (Köppen: Csa), with very warm, dry summers and mild, wetter winters. Temperatures vary between seasons, with average maxima ranging between 30.1 °C (86.2 °F) in January and 15.7 °C (60.3 °F) in July, and average minima fluctuating between 15.1 °C (59.2 °F) in January and 5.1 °C (41.2 °F) in August. Annual precipitation is low, averaging 415.1 mm (16.34 in), between 121.4 precipitation days- primarily concentrated in winter. Extreme temperatures have ranged from 46.5 °C (115.7 °F) on 24 January 2019 to −4.7 °C (23.5 °F) on 4 June 2017. Climate data is available for the Airport only since 2007.

Climate data for Cummins (34º15'00"S, 135º42'36"E, 60 m AMSL) (2007-2024 normals and extremes)
Month	Jan	Feb	Mar	Apr	May	Jun	Jul	Aug	Sep	Oct	Nov	Dec	Year
Record high °C (°F)	46.5 (115.7)	46.2 (115.2)	42.9 (109.2)	38.6 (101.5)	32.1 (89.8)	26.1 (79.0)	23.3 (73.9)	30.2 (86.4)	35.1 (95.2)	39.3 (102.7)	45.1 (113.2)	45.3 (113.5)	46.5 (115.7)
Mean daily maximum °C (°F)	30.1 (86.2)	29.1 (84.4)	27.3 (81.1)	23.8 (74.8)	19.7 (67.5)	16.6 (61.9)	15.7 (60.3)	16.6 (61.9)	19.6 (67.3)	23.2 (73.8)	26.1 (79.0)	28.3 (82.9)	23.0 (73.4)
Mean daily minimum °C (°F)	15.1 (59.2)	15.0 (59.0)	13.3 (55.9)	10.3 (50.5)	8.2 (46.8)	6.3 (43.3)	5.4 (41.7)	5.1 (41.2)	6.1 (43.0)	8.0 (46.4)	11.1 (52.0)	12.9 (55.2)	9.7 (49.5)
Record low °C (°F)	4.1 (39.4)	3.5 (38.3)	2.6 (36.7)	−1.0 (30.2)	−1.6 (29.1)	−4.7 (23.5)	−2.1 (28.2)	−1.2 (29.8)	−1.5 (29.3)	−1.0 (30.2)	0.6 (33.1)	1.5 (34.7)	−4.7 (23.5)
Average precipitation mm (inches)	21.3 (0.84)	21.1 (0.83)	14.0 (0.55)	25.3 (1.00)	41.0 (1.61)	63.1 (2.48)	61.1 (2.41)	60.2 (2.37)	39.8 (1.57)	26.2 (1.03)	20.5 (0.81)	19.5 (0.77)	415.1 (16.34)
Average precipitation days (≥ 0.2 mm)	4.1	3.8	5.8	8.2	12.4	15.3	18.4	17.8	12.8	9.1	7.6	6.1	121.4
Source: Bureau of Meteorology (2007-2024 normals and extremes)
