= Wanilla, South Australia =

Wanilla South Australia
- Coordinates: 34°31′35″S 135°40′39″E
- Population: 95 (SAL 2021)
- Established: 1882 (town); 2003 (locality)
- Postcode(s): 5607
- Elevation: 90 m (295 ft)
- Time zone: ACST (UTC+9:30)
  - Summer (DST): ACST (UTC+10:30)
- Location: 271 km (168 mi) W of Adelaide city centre; 25 km (16 mi) NW of Port Lincoln
- LGA(s): District Council of Lower Eyre Peninsula
- Region: Eyre Western
- County: Flinders
- State electorate(s): Flinders
- Federal division(s): Grey
Mean max temp	Mean min temp	Annual rainfall
21.3 °C; 70 °F	11.4 °C; 53 °F	393.9 mm 15.5 in
Suburbs around Wanilla:
Edillilie	Edillilie	Koppio
Wangary	Wanilla	Koppio; Charlton Gully
Wangary	Fountain; Pearlah; Green Patch	Green Patch
- Footnotes: Adjoining localities

Wanilla is a locality in the Australian state of South Australia located on the southern end of Eyre Peninsula about 271 kilometres (168 mi) west of the state capital of Adelaide and about 25 kilometres (16 mi) north-west of the city of Port Lincoln.

The traditional owners of the land within Wanilla are the Nauo peoples.

Wanilla began as a town surveyed in 1882 by H.J. Cant and which was later gazetted as a government town. The boundaries of the locality were created on 16 October 2003 for the “long established name.”

Wanilla is located within the federal Division of Grey, the state electoral district of Flinders and the local government area of the District Council of Lower Eyre Peninsula.

== See also ==
- Hundred of Wanilla
