= Sleaford, South Australia (disambiguation) =

Sleaford, South Australia is a locality.

Sleaford, South Australia may also refer to.

- Hundred of Sleaford, a cadastral unit
- Sleaford Bay, a bay
- Sleaford Mere, a lake or a mere

== See also ==
- Sleaford (disambiguation)
- Sleaford Mere Conservation Park
