= List of caskets =

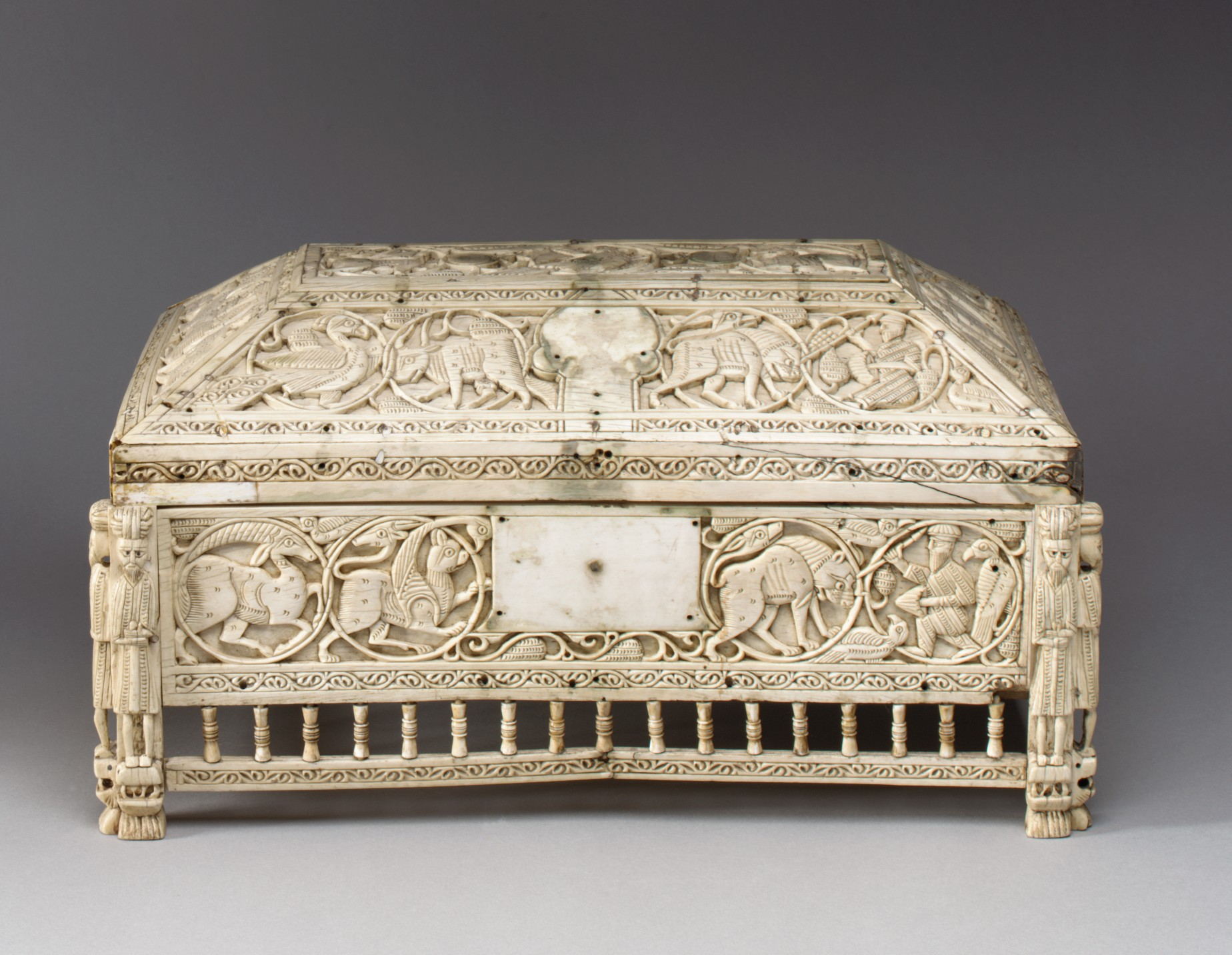
Morgan Casket, 11th–12th centuries, Southern Italy, ivory

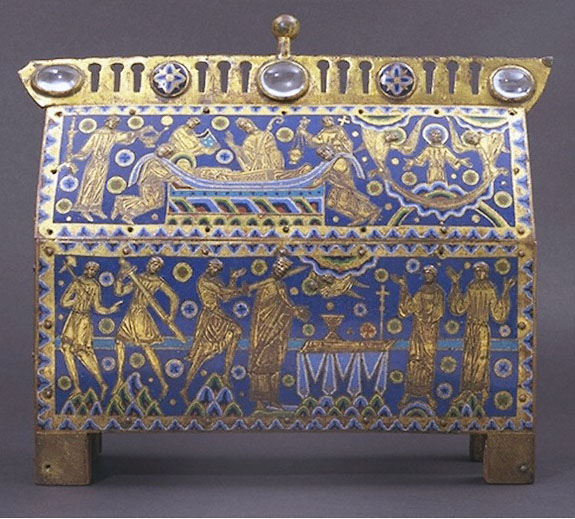
The Becket Casket, about 1180–90, Limoges enamel, France, V&A Museum no. M.66-1997

This is a list of individual caskets with articles:

- Shinkot casket, 2nd century BC, Buddhist container for reliquaries, Gandhara, stone
- Bajaur casket, 5–6 AD, Gandhara (now Pakistan), stone reliquary
- Kanishka Casket, 127, Kushan Empire (now Pakistan), gilded copper reliquary
- Bimaran casket, 1st century, Afghanistan, gold reliquary
- Brescia Casket, late 4th century, Italy, ivory reliquary
- Pyxis of Čierne Kľačany, perhaps 4th-century, Byzantine, ivory
- Franks Casket, early 8th century, Northumbria (now Northern England and south-east Scotland), bone (whale)
- Pyxis of Zamora, 964, Islamic Spain, ivory
- Pyxis of al-Mughira, 968, Islamic Spain, ivory
- Troyes Casket, 10th or 11th century, Byzantine (found in France), ivory
- Veroli Casket, late 10th or early 11th century, Constantinople (now known as Istanbul), ivory
- Cammin Casket, c. 1000, Scandinavia (lost in the Second World War of 1939–1945, although copies and a plaster cast remain), metal reliquary
- Leyre Casket, 1004–1005, Caliphate of Córdoba, Islamic Spain, ivory
- Uttoxeter Casket, c. 1050, Anglo-Saxon England, wood
- Morgan Casket, 11th–12th centuries, Southern Italy, ivory
- Becket Casket, 1180–1190, France, metal chasse reliquary
- Casket of Saint Cugat, early 14th century, Catalonia (now Spain), metal
- Casket with Scenes of Romances (Walters 71264), 1330–1350, France, ivory
- Noli me tangere casket, 1356, Germany
- Royal Casket, 1800, Poland, wood with metal fittings

== See also ==
- Chasse (casket)
- Pyxis (vessel), round form
- Pyx (for Eucharist), typically round form
