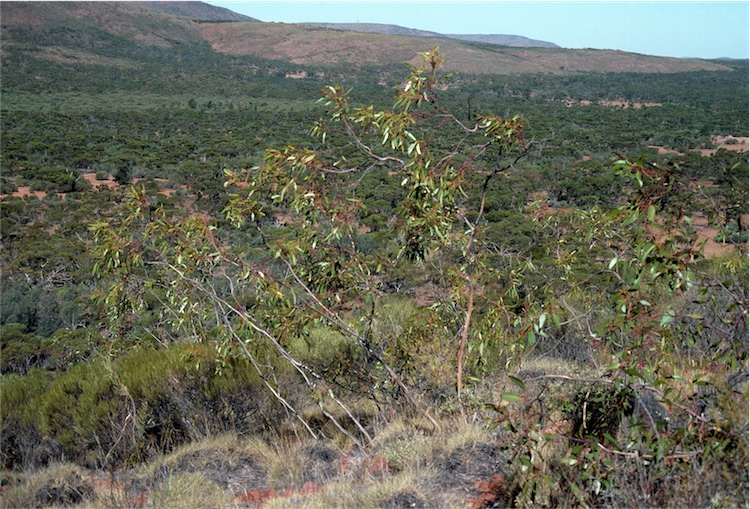
- Eucalyptus lansdowneana near Gawler

Conservation status
- Least Concern (IUCN 3.1)

Scientific classification
- Kingdom: Plantae
- Clade: Tracheophytes
- Clade: Angiosperms
- Clade: Eudicots
- Clade: Rosids
- Order: Myrtales
- Family: Myrtaceae
- Genus: Eucalyptus
- Species: E. lansdowneana

Binomial name
- Eucalyptus lansdowneana F.Muell. & J.E.Br.

= Eucalyptus lansdowneana =

Red-flowered mallee box

Species of eucalyptus

Eucalyptus lansdowneana, commonly known as the crimson mallee or the red-flowered mallee box, is a species of slender stemmed, straggly mallee that is endemic to a restricted area of South Australia. It has rough, fibrous or flaky bark at the base, smooth, grey over creamy-white bark, lance-shaped adult leaves, flower buds in groups of seven, crimson flowers and barrel-shaped fruit.

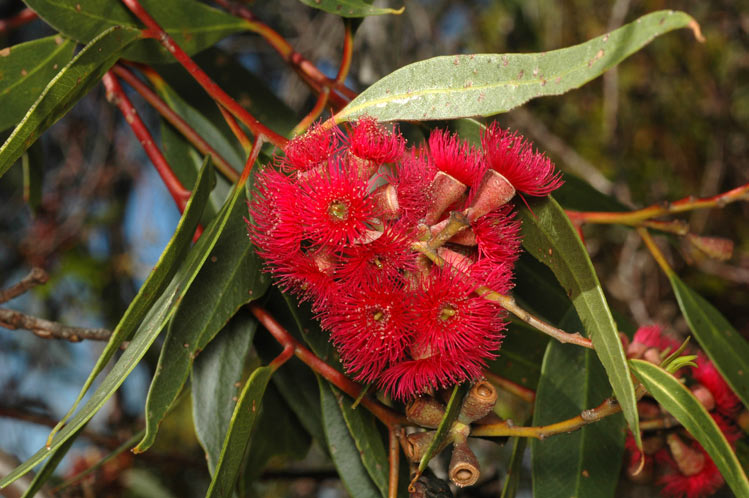
Flowers

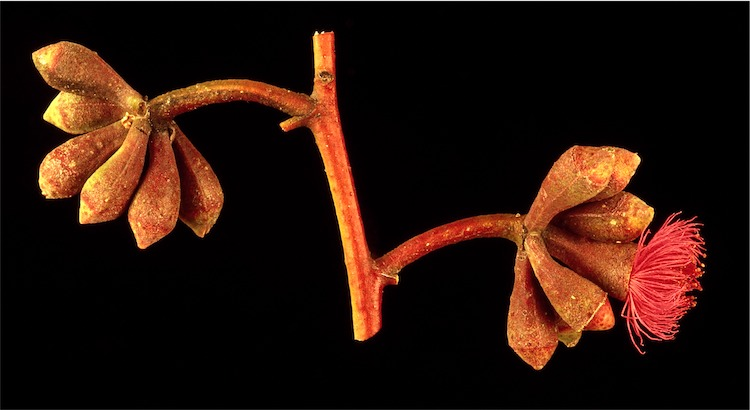
Flower buds

== Description ==
Eucalyptus lansdowneana is a mallee that typically grows to a height of 2–6 m (6 ft 7 in – 19 ft 8 in) and forms a lignotuber. It has about 2 m (6 ft 7 in) of rough, fibrous or flaky bark at the base, smooth, grey over creamy-white bark that is shed in short strips above. Young plants and coppice regrowth have broadly lance-shaped to egg-shaped leaves that are 70–100 mm (2.8–3.9 in) long and 25–35 mm (0.98–1.38 in) wide. Adult leaves are glossy green, lance-shaped, 85–155 mm (3.3–6.1 in) long and 15–27 mm (0.59–1.06 in) wide on a petiole 10–20 mm (0.39–0.79 in) long. The flower buds are arranged on both branched peduncles 3–14 mm (0.12–0.55 in) long on the ends of branchlets each branch with a group of seven buds and on unbranched peduncles in leaf axils, the individual buds sessile or on pedicels up to 3 mm (0.12 in) long. Mature buds are oval, 7–9 mm (0.28–0.35 in) long and 4–7 mm (0.16–0.28 in) wide with a conical to rounded operculum. Flowering mainly occurs between August and October and the flowers are crimson, ageing to pink. The fruit is a woody barrel-shaped capsule 9–12 mm (0.35–0.47 in) long and 7–11 mm (0.28–0.43 in) wide with the valves below rim level.

== Taxonomy and naming ==
Eucalyptus lansdownea was first formally described in 1891 by Ferdinand von Mueller and John Ednie Brown in volume 9 of Brown's book, The forest flora of South Australia. The specific epithet (lansdowneana) honours Thomas Lansdowne Browne, who collected the type specimens.

In 1974, Clifford David Boomsma described Eucalyptus lansdownea subsp. albopurpurea in the journal South Australian Naturalist but in 2000, Dean Nicolle raised the subspecies to species level as E. albopurpurea. Eucalyptus albopurpurea has a larger, more robust habit, broader leaves, usually smaller buds and fruit and white, pink or purple flowers.

== Distribution and habitat ==
Crimson mallee is restricted to the south western part of the Gawler Ranges where it grows in mallee vegetation on rocky outcrops and hilltops.

== Conservation status ==
The IUCN Red List assesses the species as Least Concern.
