= William James Browne =

Australian politician

William James Browne MRCS
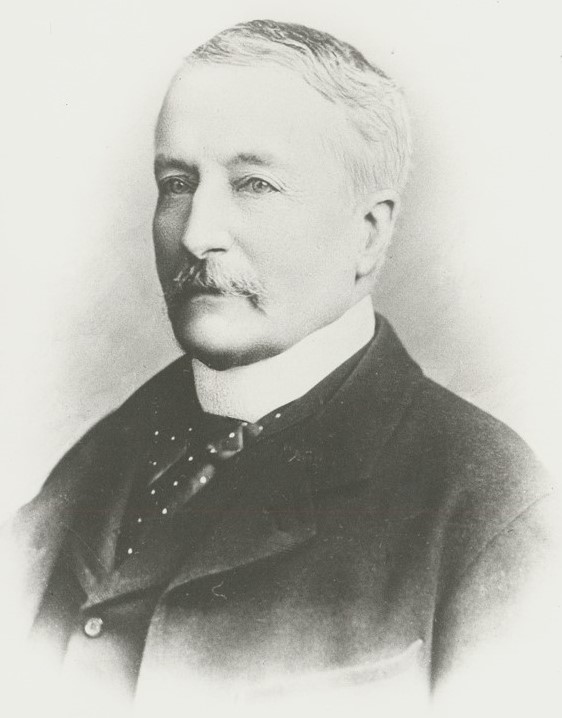
- William James Browne, 1860
- Born: 1815; Marlborough, Wiltshire, England
- Died: 4 December 1894 (aged 78–79); Eastbourne, East Sussex, England
- Occupations: Surgeon, grazier and pastoralist
- Spouse: Mary Nixon (m. 1850)
- Children: 7
- Relatives: John Harris Browne (brother); Joseph Gilbert (brother-in-law)

Member of the South Australian Parliament for Flinders
- In office 19 March 1860 – 27 November 1862
- Preceded by: Marshall MacDermott
- Succeeded by: Alfred Watts; Charles Lindsay

William James Browne, MRCS (1815 – 4 December 1894), generally referred to as Dr. Browne, was a grazier and pastoralist in South Australia who was born and died in England. His brother, John Harris Browne, was a noted explorer and pastoralist in the same colony.

== Origins ==
William Browne was born in Marlborough, Wiltshire, England, the son of Benjamin Browne, a country gentleman who died in 1821, and his wife Anna, née Cotell. His brother, J. Harris Browne (22 April 1817 – 12 January 1904) and sister Anna (1812-1873) arrived in South Australia on the Orleanna in 1840. Anna married Joseph Gilbert (1800–1881) of Pewsey Vale on 21 January 1848.

== Education ==
He was educated for the medical profession in Paris and Edinburgh, graduating in 1838.

== Agricultural career ==
Browne travelled to South Australia as assistant surgeon in the ship Buckinghamshire, arriving on 5 December 1839. Although registered to practise medicine in South Australia, he turned to agricultural pursuits on land he purchased at Pewsey Vale with Joseph Gilbert. His brother John Harris Browne and sister Anna (1812-1873) arrived in 1840 and together they ran a leasehold property at Lyndoch, then Booboorowie, steadily increasing their stockholding. Apart from huge tracts of land they leased or squatted on, they purchased significant properties: Buckland Park in 1856, "Moorak" at Mount Gambier in 1862 and Booboorowie in 1863. The partnership was dissolved around 1865. At one stage they were South Australia's largest producers of wool. Among station properties which Dr. Browne held were Mikkira, Booboorowie, Spring Vale (or Springvale) Station near Katherine, managed by Alfred Giles and Delamere. A. T. Woods was his agent who managed the forward party in 1879, then in 1880 Giles and his brother Arthur, with H. Pinder, Hart, Needham, Martin, C. Lees, T. Pearce and others, drove 6000 head of cattle, 300 horses and 14,000 sheep from Adelaide, when, despite their undoubted expertise, 6000 of the sheep perished. The stations were never profitable and by the time Browne disposed of these assets he had lost around £80,000.

== Political career ==
=== In Australia ===
Browne was a member of the House of Assembly for the district of Flinders from 19 March 1860 to 27 November 1862, during which he introduced a Bill to abolish the sale of Crown lands, and to lease them out instead, but the Bill was thrown out, and he was severely criticised for its introduction, but a similar bill was passed both houses.

=== In England ===
In 1880, in company with Lord Kintore, then Lord Inverurie, he contested the Borough of Chelsea at an election for the House of Commons but failed to be elected, Sir Charles Dilke and Mr. Firth being the successful candidates.

== Residence 1863-66 ==
From 1863 Browne lived with his family at his estate, Moorak, Mount Gambier, where he was a respected pioneer and contributed the land for, and around half the cost of building Christ Church in that city.

== Return to England 1866 ==
In 1866 Dr. Browne took his family to England for their education, where they remained, though Dr. Browne made occasional visits to South Australia. His residences in England were St Stephen's House, Kensington, London and his country estate of Buckland Filleigh in Devonshire. During one of his visits to Australia he learned of the death of his wife on about 25 February 1878. He resided on his estate of Buckland Filleigh in Devonshire, and put to good use the practical knowledge acquired in South Australia.

== Marriage and children ==
In 1850 he married Mary Nixon (1829 – 1878) by whom he had the following children:

=== Sons ===
- Leonard Gilbert Browne (1851-1930), educated at Cheltenham and Christ's College, Oxford. He was the owner of Buckland Park, Port Gawler, and inherited his father's Leigh's Creek and Myrtle Creek runs. He married Helen Mary Price c. September 1877.
- William Byron Browne (1858-1885) a lieutenant in the 14th Lancers, who went through the Nile campaign for the relief of Gordon, and died from fever whilst on the way home. Unmarried.
- Percival John "Percy" Browne (1862-1909), educated at Eton College, Colonel of the Dorset Yeomanry, Captain in Royal 1st Dragoons. He took over ownership of Moorak Station but lived in England. He married Gracia Lees on 26 April 1892.
- Major (Arthur) Scott Browne (1867-post 1937), educated at Eton College and the Royal Military Academy Sandhurst, JP, DL, of Buckland Filleigh, a lieutenant in the 16th Lancers and major in the Royal North Devon Yeomanry. On 5 June 1894 he married Mary Frances Rolle, one of the two daughters of Hon. Mark Rolle (1835–1907) of Stevenstone, Devon, life tenant of the largest estate of land in Devon. He inherited his father's Buckland Filleigh and Blackmoat estates in England, and half of the Booboorowie run in South Australia.

=== Daughters ===
- Edith Mary Browne (ca.1854 – ) became Edith Mary Carter before 1895
- Annie Ibbetson Browne (25 Dec 1855 – 17 Apr 1941) married Henry Torkington
- Kathleen Frances Browne (1861–)

== Death ==
Browne died at Eastbourne, England.

== Sources ==
- Burke's Genealogical and Heraldic History of the Landed Gentry, 15th Edition, ed. Pirie-Gordon, H., London, 1937, p. 259, pedigree of Browne of Buckland Filleigh
