= Port Lincoln (disambiguation) =

Port Lincoln is a city in South Australia.

Port Lincoln may refer to:

- Port Lincoln Airport
- Port Lincoln Football League, an Australian rules football league
- Port Lincoln Prison
- Port Lincoln Times, a newspaper
- City of Port Lincoln, a local government area

== See also ==
- Lincoln (disambiguation)
