= Kathai Conservation Park =

Protected area in South Australia

- IUCN category III (natural monument or feature)
- Location within South Australia
- Location: South Australia
- Nearest city: Port Lincoln.
- Coordinates: 34°45′14″S 135°49′48″E
- Area: 81 ha (200 acres)
- Established: 7 November 1985
- Governing body: Department for Environment and Water

Kathai Conservation Park is a protected area in the Australian state of South Australia located on the Eyre Peninsula in the gazetted locality of Duck Ponds about 5 kilometres (3.1 miles) south-west of Port Lincoln.

The conservation park is located on crown land in section 328 in the cadastral unit of the Hundred of Lincoln and which includes “a large hill” of a height of 145 metres (476 feet) above sea level called “Northside Hill”. It was constituted under the National Parks and Wildlife Act 1972 on 7 November 1985 to “protect and conserve habitat and wildlife within the Uley catchment basin”. It was proposed to be named as the Northside Hill Conservation Park but Kathai, the Aboriginal name for the hill, was approved by the Geographic Names Board. As of July 2016, the conservation park covered an area of 81 hectares (200 acres).

The conservation park is dominated by an “open mallee forest” of coastal white mallee over an understorey consisting of tall shrubs of dryland tea-tree. The purple-flowered mallee which is considered to be “regionally rare“ is found within its boundaries.

The conservation park is classified as an IUCN Category III protected area.

== See also ==
- Protected areas of South Australia
