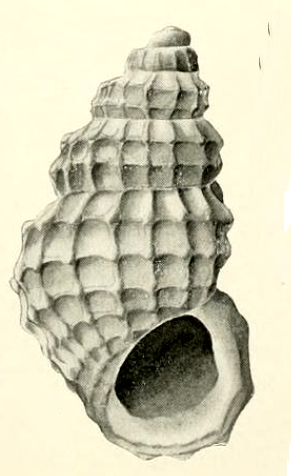
- Shell of Alvania eucraspeda (holotype)

Scientific classification
- Kingdom: Animalia
- Phylum: Mollusca
- Class: Gastropoda
- Subclass: Caenogastropoda
- Order: Littorinimorpha
- Superfamily: Rissooidea
- Family: Rissoidae
- Genus: Alvania
- Species: A. eucraspeda

Binomial name
- Alvania eucraspeda (Hedley, 1911)

Synonyms
- Rissoa hulliana var. eucraspeda Hedley, 1911 (superseded combination)

= Alvania eucraspeda =

Species of gastropod

Alvania eucraspeda is a species of small sea snail, a marine gastropod mollusk or micromollusk in the family Rissoidae.

The Australian Faunal Directory considers Rissoa hulliana var. eucraspeda a synonym of Alvania (Alvania) fasciata (Tenison-Woods, 1876)

== Description ==
The length of the shell attains 2 mm, its diameter 1.5 mm.

(Original description) This deep-sea variety differs from the typical shore form by being pure white, slightly larger and comparatively broader, and by having fewer and more prominent radials. Thus it acquires a lip broader and more scalloped, approaching a varix.

== Distribution ==
The holotype of this species was found off Cape Wiles, South Australia.
