= Coffin (disambiguation) =

A coffin is a box for interring a corpse.

Coffin or Coffyn may also refer to:

== People and fictional characters ==
- Coffin (surname), includes a list of people and fictional characters with the surname Coffin or Coffyn
- Coffin (whaling family), a historic group of Nantucket whalers

== Arts and entertainment ==
- The Coffin, a 2008 Thai horror film
- Coffin (film), a 2011 thriller film starring Kevin Sorbo
- Coffin (song), a song by Jessie Reyez
- "Coffin", a song by The Amity Affliction from the album Everyone Loves You... Once You Leave Them
- "Coffin", a song by Black Veil Brides from the EP Rebels
- "Coffin", a song by Disarmonia Mundi from the album Cold Inferno
- "Coffin", a song by Lil Yachty
- "Coffins", a song by MisterWives from Our Own House
- C.O.F.F.I.N, an Australian punk and rock band
- "Coffin" (Not Going Out), a 2023 television episode

== Other uses ==
- Coffin, a type of equestrian cross country obstacle

== See also ==
- Coffyn, a pastry casing made of Huff paste
- Casket (disambiguation)
- Coffin Bay (disambiguation)
