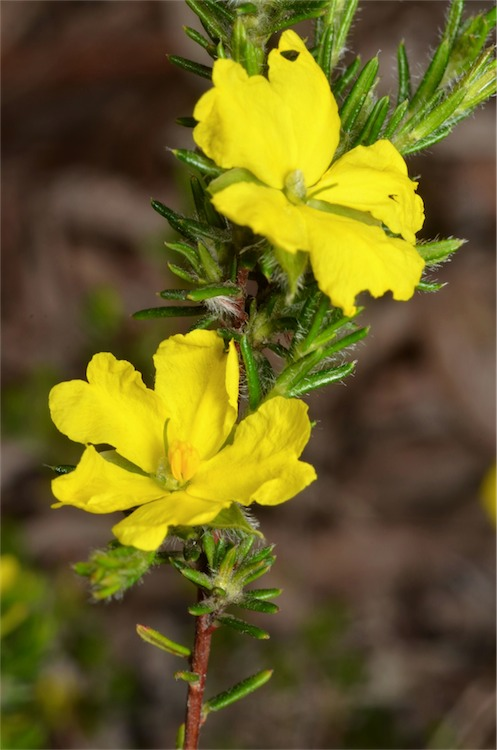
- In the Australian National Botanic Gardens

Scientific classification
- Kingdom: Plantae
- Clade: Tracheophytes
- Clade: Angiosperms
- Clade: Eudicots
- Order: Dilleniales
- Family: Dilleniaceae
- Genus: Hibbertia
- Species: H. paeninsularis

Binomial name
- Hibbertia paeninsularis J.M.Black

= Hibbertia paeninsularis =

Peninsula guinea-flower

Species of flowering plant

Hibbertia paeninsularis, commonly known as peninsula guinea-flower, is a species of flowering plant in the family Dilleniaceae and is endemic to south-eastern South Australia. It is a small, low shrub with few branches, linear to lance-shaped leaves and yellow flowers with six to eight stamens joined at the base on one side of two carpels.

== Description ==
Hibbertia paeninsularis is a shrublet that typically grows to a height of up to 25 cm (9.8 in) and has hairy, low-lying branches. The leaves are crowded, linear to lance-shaped, 4.5–6.5 mm (0.18–0.26 in) long, 0.4–0.9 mm (0.016–0.035 in) wide and sessile or on a petiole up to 0.3 mm (0.012 in) long. The edges of the leaves are rolled under obscuring the lower surface. The flowers are 10–15 mm (0.39–0.59 in) wide, usually arranged singly on the ends of side shoots and are sessile with linear to lance-shaped bracts 4.3–8.6 mm (0.17–0.34 in) long at the base. The outer sepal lobes are 1.3–1.6 mm (0.051–0.063 in) wide and the inner lobes are 2.1–2.8 mm (0.083–0.110 in) wide. The petals are egg-shaped with the narrower end towards the base, 7.5–9.5 mm (0.30–0.37 in) long and there are six to eight stamens fused together on one side of the two carpels, each carpel with six ovules. Flowering mostly occurs from September to November.

== Taxonomy ==
Hibbertia paeninsularis was first formally described in 1925 by John McConnell Black in Transactions and Proceedings of the Royal Society of South Australia from specimens he collected near Coomunga on the Eyre Peninsula in 1915.

== Distribution and habitat ==
Peninsula guinea-flower grows in forest and woodland often in wet places, and is sometimes common in cleared areas. It is found on southern parts of the Eyre Peninsula and on central Kangaroo Island.

== See also ==
- List of Hibbertia species
