= Lincoln Prison =

Lincoln Prison may refer to:

- HM Prison Lincoln, a men's prison in Lincoln, Lincolnshire, England
- Port Lincoln Prison, a low security prison in Port Lincoln, South Australia
