= Coffin Bay (disambiguation) =

Coffin Bay is a town and locality in South Australia.

Coffin Bay may also refer to.

- Coffin Bay mallee, a common name for Eucalyptus albopurpurea
- Coffin Bay National Park, a protected area in South Australia
- Coffin Bay pony, a variety of feral horse found in South Australia
- Coffin Bay Peninsula, a peninsula in South Australia
- Coffin Bay Tramway, former railway line in South Australia

== See also ==
- Coffin (disambiguation)
