= Liguanea Island =

Island in South Australia

Coordinates: 34°59′20″S 135°37′17″E

Geography
- Location: Great Australian Bight

Administration
- Australia

Liguanea Island is an uninhabited granite island in the Australian state of South Australia located 3.7 km south of Cape Carnot at the southern, central point of Eyre Peninsula. It is approximately 2.7 km long, 180 ha in size its elevation above sea level is estimated to be 43 metres. It is approximately 35 km south-west of Port Lincoln in the Great Australian Bight. The island forms part of the Lincoln National Park.

== History ==
Liguanea Island was named by British explorer Matthew Flinders on 18 February 1802. The following day, Flinders named the nearby headland Cape Wiles "after a worthy friend at Liguanea, in Jamaica." In Flinders' atlas (Plate 17) there is a view of the cape and the island as seen from his ship, The Investigator.

The same year, French explorer Nicolas Baudin named the island as Ile Guyton.

In 1905, the ship Governor Musgrave called by Liguanea Island while searching for the wreckage of the lost vessel, Loch Vennachar. A newspaper correspondent on the vessel described the island as "a large bare block of forbidding granite some miles in extent."

In 1914, a buck and two does were placed on Liguanea Island.

The island first obtained protected area status as a fauna conservation reserve declared under the Crown Lands Act 1929-1966 on 16 March 1967.

On 26 May 1980 biodiversity data was collected on Liguanea Island. Among there species recorded were Australian sea-lion, little penguin, Cape Barren goose and bush rat. Little penguin breeding on the island was acknowledged in a 1996 survey of South Australia's offshore islands.
