= Fishery Bay Whaling Station =

Former Fishery Bay Whaling Station
- Location within South Australia

General information
- Type: Whaling station
- Location: Sleaford, South Australia, Australia
- Coordinates: 34°54′32″S 135°41′05″E
- Closed: after 1843
- Owner: United Fishing Company of Adelaide

Design and construction
- Designations: South Australian Heritage Register (1982)

Fishery Bay whaling station was a whaling station located in the Colony of South Australia on the coast of Fishery Bay, a subsidiary of the larger Sleaford Bay, on Eyre Peninsula about 32 kilometres (20 mi) south-west of Port Lincoln. It operated in the 1830s and 1840s and helped to provide the colony with one of its first export commodities.

== History ==
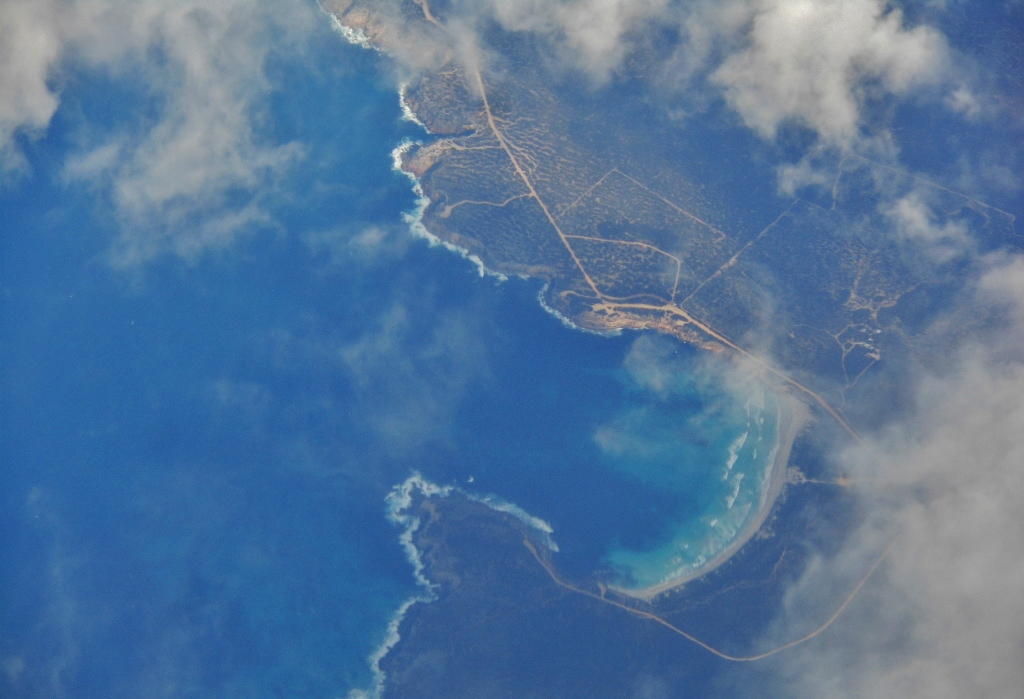
Fishery Bay from the air in 2012.

A shore-based whaling station was operating at Fishery Bay by late 1837. In November the schooner Siren left Port Adelaide for Sleaford Bay “to take on a cargo of oil from the station there.” By 1839 the station was under the control of the United Fishing Company of Adelaide, which was a partnership between the South Australian Company and Messsrs Hack and Company.

The South Australian company sold out in 1841 and the Hack brothers then became sole owners. They in turn found themselves in financial difficulties in the depression of the early 1840s and were declared insolvent in 1843. Hagan and Hart purchased the station, as well as another owned by the Hack brothers at Rosetta Head. They operated the Fishery Bay station for three or four months before closing it down. No further whaling seems to have occurred at the location after 1843.

Archaeological investigations in the area have identified the remains of buildings and artifacts associated with the whaling station.

The site, which is located in the locality of Sleaford, was added the South Australian Heritage Register on 23 September 1982. The land on which the former whaling station was located was previously declared as a historic reserve under the Aboriginal and Historic Relics Preservation Act 1965 on 31 August 1972.
