= Boston, South Australia =

Boston South Australia
- Coordinates: 34.682330°S 135.823710°E
- Population: 390 (UCL 2021)
- Postcode(s): 5607
- Time zone: ACST (UTC+9:30)
  - Summer (DST): ACST (UTC+10:30)
- Location: 252 km (157 mi) west of Adelaide city centre; 6.9 km (4 mi) north of Port Lincoln
- LGA(s): Lower Eyre Peninsula
- Region: Eyre Western
- County: Flinders
- State electorate(s): Flinders
- Federal division(s): Grey
Mean max temp	Mean min temp	Annual rainfall
21.2 °C; 70 °F	11.4 °C; 53 °F	389.7 mm 15.3 in
Localities around Boston:
Tiatukia; Hawson	Tiatukia	Spencer Gulf
Hawson	Boston	Spencer Gulf
Duck Ponds	Port Lincoln	Spencer Gulf
- Footnotes: Climate

Boston is a locality on the Eyre Peninsula of South Australia, situated in the District Council of Lower Eyre Peninsula. It consists of a coastal section immediately north of Port Lincoln and a broader area inland; while it is residential along the coast, much of the locality remains semi-rural. The name and boundaries were formalised in October 2003 for the long established local name. On 15 October 2009, sections of Boston were severed and added to North Shields and the new locality of Tiatukia, while a portion of adjacent Hawson was added to Boston.

The Lincoln Highway runs along the coast through Boston. The Port Lincoln Golf Course is located in its southwestern corner.

Boston House, located on Lincoln Highway, is listed on the South Australian Heritage Register. The National Trust of South Australia-owned Brinkworth Reserve, which was the subject of a prominent public campaign over a cancelled sale attempt in 2014–15, is also located at Boston.
