= Casket =

Casket or caskets may refer to:

- Coffin, a box used for the display and interment or entombment of corpses
- Casket (decorative box), a decorated container, usually larger than about 10 centimetres (4 inches) in width and length, but smaller than a chest
  - Chasse (casket), a decorated container typically from medieval Europe having a shape that resembles a house
- Casket (solitaire), a card game
- Caskets (band), British rock band

== See also ==
- The Casket, weekly newspaper published in Antigonish, Nova Scotia, Canada
- List of caskets
