= Duck Ponds, South Australia =

Duck Ponds South Australia
- Coordinates: 34°43′22″S 135°46′59″E
- Population: 284 (SAL 2021)
- Established: 16 October 2003
- Postcode(s): 5607
- Time zone: ACST (UTC+9:30)
  - Summer (DST): ACST (UTC+10:30)
- Location: 258 km (160 mi) west of Adelaide; 51 km (32 mi) south of Cummins; 6 km (4 mi) west of Port Lincoln
- LGA(s): District Council of Lower Eyre Peninsula
- Region: Eyre Western
- County: Flinders
- State electorate(s): Flinders
- Federal division(s): Grey
Mean max temp	Mean min temp	Annual rainfall
21.3 °C; 70 °F	11.4 °C; 53 °F	394.6 mm 15.5 in
Suburbs around Duck Ponds:
Uley	Coomunga; Hawson; Boston	Boston; Port Lincoln
Uley	Duck Ponds	Port Lincoln
Uley	Tulka	Port Lincoln
- Footnotes: Locations; Adjoining localities

Duck Ponds is a locality in the Australian state of South Australia located on the Eyre Peninsula in the state's west about 258 kilometres (160 mi) west of the state capital of Adelaide, about 51 kilometres (32 mi) south of the municipal seat of Cummins and about 6 kilometres (3.7 mi) west of the city of Port Lincoln.

Its boundaries were created on 16 October 2003 for the "long established name". On 22 December 2011, a portion was added to the adjoining locality of Tulka.

The Flinders Highway forms part of the locality's north-eastern boundary with the locality of Boston while the highway's heavy vehicle by-pass, the Western Approach Road, passes through the eastern side of the locality from the north-west on its way to the port facility in Port Lincoln. The Eyre Peninsula Railway, which also passes through Duck Ponds in an alignment similar to the by-pass road, forms part of its southern boundary and hosts two railway stations: Grantham in the south, established as Five Mile Siding about 1942, and Ducks Ponds in the locality's centre, established in 1911. The Port Lincoln Prison occupies land in the locality's north-east corner while the Kathai Conservation Park, a protected area, is located in its south-east corner.

Land use within Duck Ponds principally consists of agricultural activities such as broadacre cropping and grazing. Land use is subject to statutory control to manage the aquifer system existing within Duck Ponds and adjoining localities.

Duck Ponds is located within the federal division of Grey, the state electoral district of Flinders and the local government area of the District Council of Lower Eyre Peninsula.
