= Cordula of Cologne =

4th-century apocryphal saint

Saint Cordula of Cologne
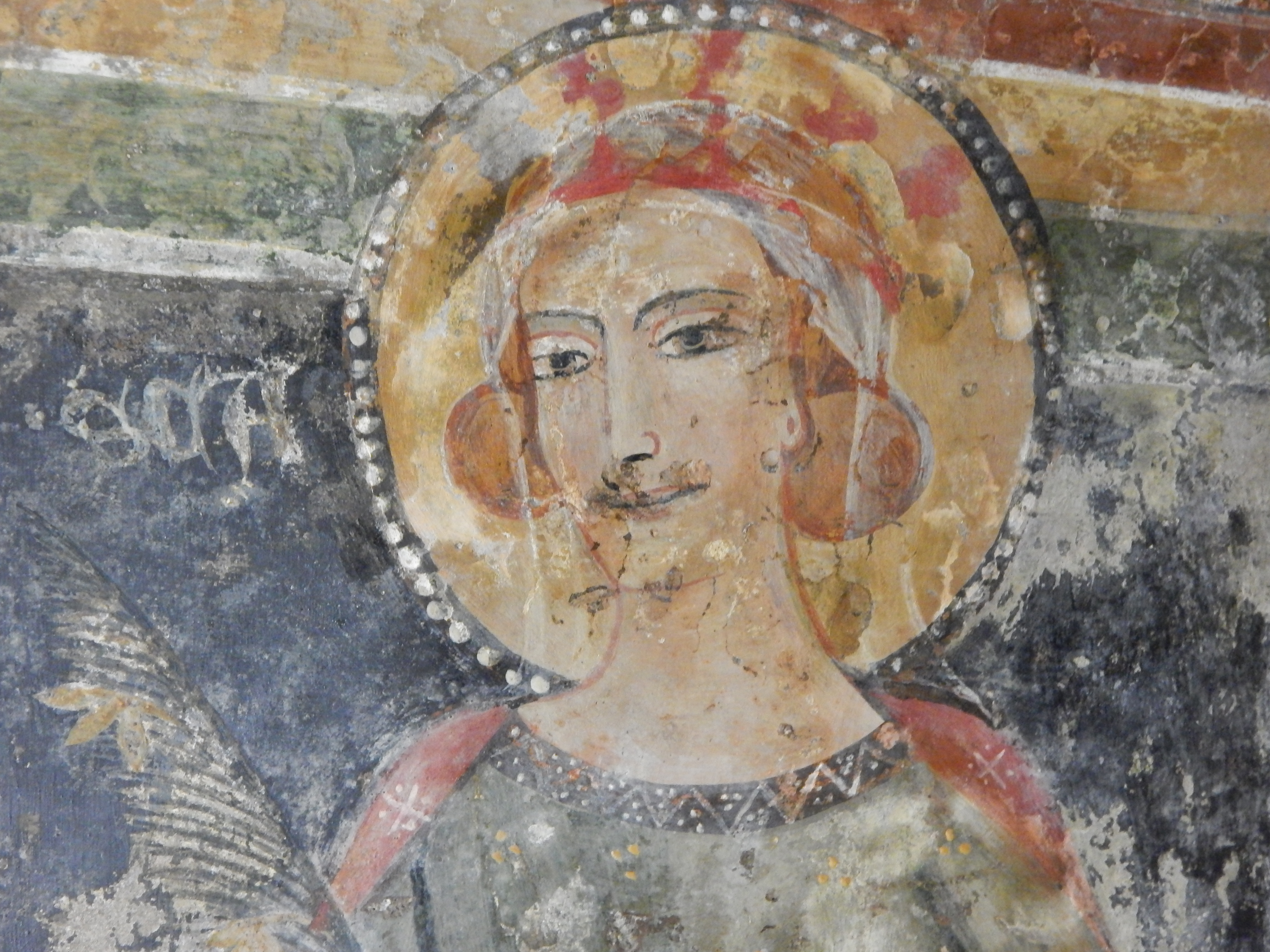

Virgin and martyr
- Died: Cologne
- Feast: 22 October
- Catholic cult suppressed: 1969

Cordula of Cologne, also known as Saint Cordula, is an apocryphal saint. She was venerated in the Catholic Church as a companion of St. Ursula and her feast day was on 22 October, but she has not been listed in the Roman Martyrology since 1969 due to doubts about her historicity.

== Biography ==
According to medieval folklore, she was one of the companions of St. Ursula who is said to have come from Brittany to Cologne in the fourth century. There, Ursula and with her eleven thousand virgins were killed by Hunnic invaders. Cordula hid away to escape the fate of her companions, but stung by her conscience, she emerged the day after the massacre and was also killed.

== Veneration ==
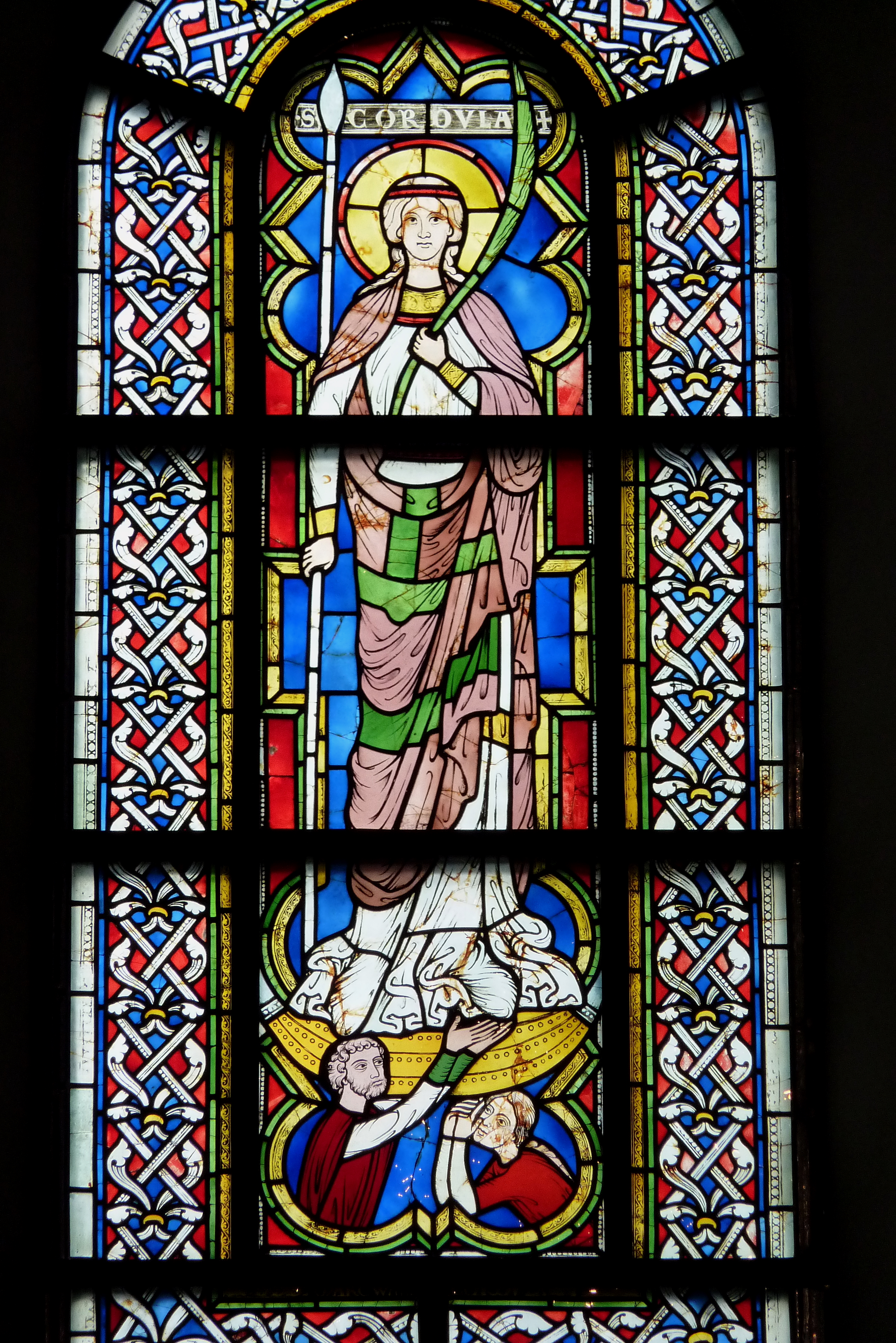
St. Cordula in the Catholic Church of St. Kunibert of Cologne

Around the middle of the twelfth century, the nun Helentrudis from the convent of Heerse claimed that she had been visited in her dream by a young woman who informed her that she was a companion of St. Ursula and that her name was Cordula. Since that time, Cordula started to be venerated as a saint. Her alleged body was found in 1278 in the vineyard of the commandery of the St. Johan commandery of the Knights Hospitallers when one of their knights also had a nightly visitation by Cordula. Her remains where then translated (possibly by Albertus Magnus himself) to the chapel of the commandery where they were interred. In overcoming her fears and joining her companions in martyrdom, she served as a model for addressing and conquering human hesitation.

The veneration of St. Cordula, St. Ursula and her companions spread soon beyond the borders of Cologne to Osnabrück, Valenciennes, Marchiennes and Tortosa. This was facilitated primarily via monastic communities and in the thirteenth century the Dominicans promoted their cult not only through material relics but also by hagiographic productions which were often sung during Matins in the refectory.

Her cult was especially strong among female orders and convents. Wienhausen Abbey received at some point a relic of St. Cordula from Cologne, possibly together with those of St. Ursula, St. Maurice and St. Gregory, showing the close ties the abbey had with the metropolitan see of Cologne. The Cammin Casket of the Cathedral of Saint John in Cammin contained another part of the body of St. Cordula.

Her veneration spread as far as the Convent of Jesus in Aveiro, Portugal, where a statue of her can be found in the chapel of Our Lady of Conception and it is possible that a relic of Cordula was also present. Special songs and devotion dedicated to St. Cordula and the other Cologne virgins show the special place the cult took in the female convent.

While she was still listed in the Martyrologium Romanum of 1961, she is not recorded in the Martyrologium Romanum as of 2004. The official stance of the Catholic Church is that the story of St. Ursula and her eleven thousand companions "is entirely fabulous: nothing, not even their names, is known about the virgin saints who were killed at Cologne at some uncertain time". As of 2004, the Martyrologium Romanum entry for 21 October mentions only St. Ursula and her companions without numbering them at eleven thousand or mentioning Cordula specifically.

== In popular culture ==
The story of Cordula was also depicted in art, such as in the late fifteenth century panel of the Martyrdom of St. Cordula before the City of Cologne.

Cordula appeared as St. Ursula's confidant in the opera La regina Sant'Orsola by Andrea Salvadori. As such, she was the secondary female role in the opera, a role first filled by Francesca Caccini. Czech Pop singer Aneta Langerová has on her fourth album Na Radosti a song named after Cordula, Svatá Kordula.

== Sources ==
- Borrelli, Andrea. "Santa Cordula". Santiebeati.it. SantiBeati.
- Gould, Sabine Baring (1877). The lives of the saints. 12 vols. [in 15].
- Harness, Kelley (15 February 2006). Echoes of Women's Voices: Music, Art, and Female Patronage in Early Modern Florence. University of Chicago Press. ISBN 978-0-226-31659-8.
- Hoefner, Kristin (9 August 2023). "Observant Reform and Dominican Church Interiors". In Delcorno, Pietro; Roest, Bert (eds.). Observant Reforms and Cultural Production in Europe: Learning, Liturgy and Spiritual Practice. Radboud University Press. ISBN 978-94-93296-08-4.
- Langerová, Aneta. "2. Svatá Kordula :: Aneta Langerová – oficiální web". www.langerovaaneta.cz (in Czech). Art Shock s.r.o.
- Militzer, Klaus (5 July 2017). "The Hospitaller Fraternity of St John at SS Johan and Cordula of Cologne". In Mallia-Milanes, Victor (ed.). The Military Orders Volume III: History and Heritage. Routledge. pp. 253–256. ISBN 978-1-351-54253-1.
- Montgomery, Scott Bradford (2010). St. Ursula and the Eleven Thousand Virgins of Cologne: Relics, Reliquaries and the Visual Culture of Group Sanctity in Late Medieval Europe. Peter Lang. ISBN 978-3-03911-852-6.
- O'Connell, Canon J.B., ed. (1962). The Roman Martyrology. Angelus press. ISBN 978-1-949124-76-7.
- Röckelein, Hedwig; Noga-Banai, Galit; Pinchover, Lotem (2019). "The Cult of the Invisible". Devotional Cross-Roads. Universitätsverlag Göttingen. ISBN 978-3-86395-372-0.
- Sighart, Joachim (1876). Albert the Great : his life and scholastic labours : from original documents. London : Washbourne.
- Vandenbrouck, Melanie (12 September 2011). "Strange encounter: a dragon's egg nestled in the Museum's attic • V&A Blog". V&A Blog. Victoria and Albert Museum.
- Calendarium Romanum. 1969.
- Martirologio Romano (PDF). Libreria Editrice Vaticana. 2004.
