= Sleaford (disambiguation) =

Sleaford is a town in Lincolnshire, England.

Sleaford may also refer to:

== Places ==
=== Australia ===
- Sleaford, South Australia (disambiguation), articles associated with the locality in South Australia

=== United Kingdom ===
- Sleaford, Lincolnshire
  - Sleaford railway station
  - Sleaford (UK Parliament constituency)
- Sleaford, Hampshire, a hamlet in Hampshire, England
- Sleaford, Newark-on-Trent, a ward in Nottinghamshire, England
