= Uley, South Australia =

Uley South Australia
- Coordinates: 34°41′28″S 135°37′56″E
- Population: 0 (SAL 2016)
- Established: 16 October 2003
- Postcode(s): 5607
- Time zone: ACST (UTC+9:30)
  - Summer (DST): ACST (UTC+10:30)
- Location: 273 km (170 mi) W of Adelaide city centre; 22 km (14 mi) W of Port Lincoln
- LGA(s): District Council of Lower Eyre Peninsula
- Region: Eyre Western
- County: Flinders
- State electorate(s): Flinders
- Federal division(s): Grey
Mean max temp	Mean min temp	Annual rainfall
21.3 °C; 70 °F	11.4 °C; 53 °F	394.6 mm 15.5 in
Suburbs around Uley:
Coffin Bay	Wangary; Fountain	Fountain
Coffin Bay	Uley	Coomunga; Duck Ponds; Tulka
Great Australian Bight	Sleaford	Sleaford
- Footnotes: Location; Coordinates; Climate; Adjoining localities

Uley is a locality in the Australian state of South Australia located at the southern tip of the Eyre Peninsula overlooking the body of water known as the Great Australian Bight about 273 kilometres (170 mi) west of the state capital of Adelaide and about 22 kilometres (14 mi) west of the city of Port Lincoln.

The boundaries of the locality were created on 16 October 2003 for the “long established name” which is derived from the cadastral unit of the Hundred of Uley and is ultimately derived from “a village in Gloucestershire, England.”

Land use within Uley consists of ‘coastal conservation’ to the coastline on its south-west boundary, ‘primary production’ in its south-east corner and with the remainder of its extent being zoned as ‘water protection’ in order to manage the aquifer system existing within Uley and adjoining localities.

Uley is located within the federal Division of Grey, the state electoral district of Flinders and the local government area of the District Council of Lower Eyre Peninsula.
