= Sleaford Mere =

Lake in South Australia

- Kuyabidni
- Location within South Australia
- Location: Proper Bay Road, Sleaford, South Australia
- Coordinates: 34°50′08″S 135°44′26″E
- Type: Endorheic basin
- Etymology: Parish of Sleaford in Lincolnshire, England
- Part of: Southern Basins Prescribed Wells Area
- Primary inflows: local runoff & groundwater
- River sources: none
- Primary outflows: none
- Basin countries: Australia
- Managing agency: Department for Environment and Water
- Designation: Conservation park
- Max. length: about 4.8 to 6.4 kilometres (3 to 4 mi)
- Max. width: about 1.6 kilometres (1 mile)
- Surface area: 7.07 km^{2} (2.73 sq mi)
- Average depth: 0.61 to 0.91 metres (2 to 3 ft) ("a few feet deep")
- Salinity: 23.0 – 64.0 millisiemens per cm
- Surface elevation: 20 metres (66 feet)
- Islands: ‘some small islands.’

Sleaford Mere (alternative name: Kuyabidni) is a permanent saline lake, located on the Jussieu Peninsula on the south eastern tip of Eyre Peninsula in South Australia about 15 kilometres (9.3 miles) south west of Port Lincoln. The lake was given its modern name by the British explorer, Matthew Flinders, on 26 February 1802. Since 1969, the lake has been part of the Sleaford Mere Conservation Park and since 2005, it has been listed as a nationally important wetland. The lake and its environs are notable as a venue for recreational pursuits such as canoeing.

== Description ==
Sleaford Mere is a permanent salt lake with an area of 7.07 km^{2} (2.73 sq mi). It is about 4.8 kilometres (3 mi) to 6.4 kilometres (4 mi) long in the north-south direction and about 1.6 kilometres (1 mi) wide from west to east. It is reported as being ‘a few feet deep’ and as having ‘some small islands.’ Since 2003, the lake has been located within the locality of Sleaford.

== Hydrology ==
Sleaford Mere is supplied directly by local runoff and indirectly by groundwater sources. In respect to local runoff, the locality around the lake receives 500 millimetres (20 inches) of rainfall per annum. As of 2005, it was reported that it was not known if groundwater was being supplied from a single basin or multiple basins. In respect to groundwater, the lake is part of a potable water administration area known as the Southern Basins Prescribed Wells Area which covers the area of Eyre Peninsula between the city of Port Lincoln and the town of Coffin Bay.

== Geology ==
Sleaford Mere was formed within a depression in a limestone strata known as the Bridgewater Formation.

== Natural history ==
=== Flora ===
Stromatolites are present at the lake's edge. Land immediately adjoining the lake supports tall open shrubland dominated by dryland tea-tree and a sedgeland of Gahnia trifida. Species of conservation significance include the common spleenwort and Eyre Peninsula bitter-pea. As of 2009, Aleppo pine, an introduced species, was considered to an infestation risk.

=== Fauna ===
The lake is notable as a bird habitat. The northern end of the lake has been identified as being suitable habitat for southern emu-wren. The lake supports food sources such as fish species such as ‘hardy heads’ (sp: Atherinosoma) which are consumed by bird species such as Pacific gull, pied cormorant, pied oystercatcher, red-capped plover, silver gull and the two following species protected by the Japan–Australia Migratory Bird Agreement and the China–Australia Migratory Bird Agreement: sharp-tailed sandpiper and curlew sandpiper. Species of conservation significance known to visit the lake include fairy tern, hooded plover and musk duck. The lake is reported as containing marine species of fish, including ‘a large, land-locked population of skates’. Western grey kangaroo is reported as being within the vicinity of the lake. The land surrounding the lake supports foxes, an introduced species which is the subject of ongoing pest animal control programs.

== History ==
=== Aboriginal use ===
The lake and adjoining land is reported in 2009 as being associated with the Barngarla and Nauo peoples. As of 2009, there was no record of the lake or an object discovered in or near the lake being of ‘significance according to Aboriginal tradition or of significance to Aboriginal archaeology, anthropology or history.’ The native name for the lake was reported in 1908 as being Kuyabidni (also spelt as Kujabidni).

=== European use ===
The lake was seen by Matthew Flinders on Friday 26 February 1802 and named after a parish in Lincolnshire, England. Flinders visited the lake to investigate it as a source of water but found that its water was undrinkable. He described the lake as follows:

This piece of water was named Sleaford Mere. It is one mile broad, and appeared to be three or four in length. The shore was a whitish, hardened clay, covered at this time with a thin crust, in which salt was a component part.

— Flinders (1802)

== Economy ==
Economic activity is mainly associated with the use of the Sleaford Mere Conservation Park and the adjoining Lincoln National Park for recreational and leisure purpose by persons either resident in the lower Eyre Peninsula or visiting from elsewhere. As of 2007, a walking trail associated with the Lincoln National Park passes the east side of the lake. As of 2009, the lake was being used occasionally as a canoeing venue, particularly by school and holiday groups. Also, the lake can be used as a swimming venue, however this use may be discouraged by the lake’s relative shallow depth and high salinity. As of 1980, ‘a holiday complex’ was reported as being ‘situated on the southern shore of the Lake.’

== Protected area status ==
Sleaford Mere and some adjoining land was proclaimed as a national park in January 1969 for the purpose of conserving ‘conserve important lake feeding habitat for wader birds.‘ In 2005, Sleaford Mere was included in a non-statutory listing of nationally important wetlands located in South Australia as part of A Directory of Important Wetlands in Australia.

== See also ==
- Mere (lake)
- Mikkira
