= Mikkira =

Pastoral lease in South Australia

Coordinates: 34.838°S 135.681°E

Location in South Australia

Mikkira Station is a pastoral lease that operates as a sheep station in South Australia.

It is situated approximately 22 kilometres (14 mi) south west of Port Lincoln and 31 kilometres (19 mi) south east of Coffin Bay on the Eyre Peninsula. The property is composed of grassy plains well watered by Sleaford Mere, Fishery Creek and other permanent springs along with numerous wells.

The traditional owners of the area are the Barngalla, Nauo and Battara peoples, who inhabited the Eyre peninsula for thousands of years and often camped at the permanent Mikkira waterhole while travelling along the coastline.

Settled in 1842, Mikkira was one of the first properties settled on the lower Eyre Peninsula.

The station was placed on the market in 1863; it had some improvements and was stocked with 9,700 sheep. Owned by the Cadby Brothers, Mikkira occupied an area of 141 square miles (365 km^{2}). It contained a homestead, workers huts, store, kitchen, wool shed and drafting yards.

The property was owned by William James Browne from before 1870 to at least 1881; the property was being managed by Alexander Tolmer from 1864 to 1887.

In 1884 Mikkira was put up for auction when it was stocked with about 6,000 sheep.

John William Henderson acquired Mikkira in 1911 and held it until his death in 1914.

The Theakstone family acquired the station in 1923, with the family still owning the property today. Elizabeth de la Perrelle (née Theakstone) took over the freehold in 1986.

In 2012 the station was struck by the Sleaford bushfire and several koalas at the property were killed. A count was completed in 2013 and found 114 koalas as were found in the sanctuary area, although some of their habitat had been destroyed by the flames.

== See also ==
- List of ranches and stations
