= Tulka, South Australia =

Tulka South Australia
- Coordinates: 34°47′43″S 135°47′55″E
- Population: 126 (SAL 2016)
- Established: 2003
- Postcode(s): 5607
- Time zone: ACST (UTC+9:30)
  - Summer (DST): ACST (UTC+10:30)
- Location: 259 km (161 mi) W of Adelaide; 10 km (6 mi) W of Port Lincoln
- LGA(s): District Council of Lower Eyre Peninsula
- Region: Eyre Western
- County: Flinders
- State electorate(s): Flinders
- Federal division(s): Grey
| Mean max temp | Mean min temp | Annual rainfall |
| 21.2 °C; 70 °F | 11.3 °C; 52 °F | 383.2 mm 15.1 in |
Suburbs around Tulka:
| Uley | Duck Ponds | Port Lincoln |
| Uley | Tulka | Port Lincoln (water body) |
| Sleaford | Sleaford | Port Lincoln (water body) |
- Footnotes: Location; Adjoining localities

Tulka is a locality in the Australian state of South Australia located on the southern tip of Eyre Peninsula overlooking the western end of the body of water known as Port Lincoln and which is located 259 kilometres (161 miles) west of the state capital of Adelaide and about 10 kilometres (6.2 miles) west of the city of Port Lincoln.

The boundaries of the locality were created in October 2003 for the “long established name.” The boundary with the locality of Sleaford was altered in both 2006 and 2011.

Land use within Tulka includes both agriculture and conservation with the latter being represented by the Lincoln Conservation Park. Land use is subject to statutory control in order to manage the aquifer system existing within Tulka and adjoining localities.

Tulka is located within the federal Division of Grey, the state electoral district of Flinders and the local government area of the District Council of Lower Eyre Peninsula.
