= Cape Wiles =

Cape Wiles South Australia
- Coordinates: 34°56′44.3″S 135°41′3.3″E
- Elevation: 143 m (469 ft)
- Location: 27 km (17 mi) south west of Port Lincoln

Cape Wiles is a headland located on the west side of the southern tip of Eyre Peninsula in South Australia about 27 kilometres (17 miles) south west of the city of Port Lincoln. The cape is described by one source as being the south east extremity of “a broad promontory” of which Cape Carnot is the south west extremity at a distance of 3 nautical miles (5.6 kilometres; 3.5 miles) to the west. The cape also is the western extremity of Sleaford Bay.

== Name ==
Cape Wiles was named by Matthew Flinders on 19 February 1802 after James Wiles, a botanist whom he described as “a worthy friend at Liguanea, in Jamaica”, along with the nearby Liguanea Island. Wiles had been a friend of Joseph Banks then became First Gardener on the Second Breadfruit Voyage (1791–1793) under William Bligh and Flinders had been a midshipman on the same voyage. He left the ship in Jamaica and became gardener at a public nursery, then Island Botanist. He later owned two coffee plantations. Wiles was a beneficiary of slavery from the British West Indies. The slaves on his plantations had been valued at £4,160.

== Uses ==
The cape is the site of a high frequency radar station which is used to collect data about wind direction and wave height. Since 2012, the waters adjoining its shoreline are within a habitat protection zone in the Thorny Passage Marine Park.
