= John Harris Browne =

- Born: 22 April 1817; Ilford, Wiltshire, England
- Died: 12 January 1904 (aged 86); Bath
- Occupations: explorer in Australia and a pioneer pastoralist

John Harris Browne (22 April 1817 – 12 January 1904), generally referred to as J. Harris Browne, was an explorer in Australia and a pioneer pastoralist.

== Early years ==
Browne was born in Ilford, Wiltshire, England, son of Benjamin Browne, landowner, and his wife Tara. He was well educated, studying at the Ecole de Médecine, Paris and qualified for the medical profession at the University of Edinburgh.

== Life ==
Browne migrated to South Australia in 1840 with his sister Anna, arriving aboard the Orleanna. There he took up land, initially at Lyndoch in the Barossa Valley.
