= J. Ednie Brown =

John Ednie Brown
- Born: 1848; Scotland
- Died: October 26, 1899 (aged 50–51); Cottesloe, Perth, Western Australia
- Occupations: Forester, Public servant
- Spouse: Bertha Amelia
- Parent(s): James Brown, LL.D. Jeannette, née Erskine

John Ednie Brown (1848 – 26 October 1899) J.P., F.L.S., commonly referred to as Ednie or J. Ednie Brown, was an author on sylviculture and state conservator of forests.

== Biography ==
The author's contemporary entry in George E. Loyau's Notable South Australians relates his biographical details:

[T]he son of Dr. J[ames] Brown, LL.D., author of The Forester (one of the best and most comprehensive works on forestry of the present day), late Deputy-Surveyor of H.M. woods and forests in Great Britain, and of late years the most eminent authority on arboricultural matters in Europe. The subject of this memoir was educated in Edinburgh, and on leaving school in 1863, was dedicated to his father's profession, and spent three years with him in the practical management of nursery and forest work, and in reporting on the management of the woods and forests in England and Scotland. After learning his profession as assistant agent and forester upon the Invercauld Estate in Aberdeenshire (on which there were 20,000 acres of woodlands, and plantations of over 1,000 acres in extent formed in one season), Mr. Brown went to the Wass Estate, in Yorkshire, where he laid out plantations and surveyed a property of about 8,000 acres. He was then next employed in managing the woods of Lady Manxe, in Sussex. In 1871 and 1872, he visited the U.S. of America and Canada, gathering much valuable information on the forests of those countries. Appointed Conservator of Forests for South Australia in 1878, a position which he still holds with satisfaction to the Government and the public. Mr. Brown has received many testimonials from those who appreciate his abilities, and among the honors he has gained, the following may be enumerated:—He is Gold Medalist of the Highland and Agricultural Society of Scotland, for "Report upon Trees found in California," Silver Medalist of the Scottish Arboricultural Society, for "Report on Trees found in the Canadian Forests," holds silver medal and diploma from the International Forestry Exhibition of Edinburgh, held in 1884, for exhibits in botanical specimens and forest literature. Is author of works on "Tree Culture in South Australia," "The Forest Flora of South Australia," and "Canada as a field for the farmer and laborer."

He arrived in South Australia sometime around 1880. He was appointed Conservator of Forests in South Australia in 1878 and served for ten years, then accepted a similar position in New South Wales. He came to Western Australia in 1894.

He was commissioned in 1895 to produce a report on forest resources for the state government of Western Australia, undertaking research that included journeying over five thousand kilometres in a year, and leading to the formation of the Department of Woods and Forests, of which he was appointed to head as the first conservator. During his tenure he encouraged the introduction of softwood plantations and sandalwood, and is credited with a fivefold increase in the export value of the state's hardwood resources. His reporting was regarded as careful and considered, despite his prodigious output. A reprint in 1899 of his extensive 1896 report is amongst his published works.

He had three sons with his wife, Bertha Amelia, the daughter of James Doughty Willshire of South Australia. John Ednie Brown died at Cottesloe, Western Australia of complications arising from influenza and was buried at North Fremantle.
