= Coomunga, South Australia =

Locality in South Australia

Coomunga
- Town
- Interactive map of Coomunga
- Coordinates: 34.6°S 135.7°E
- Country: Australia
- State: South Australia
- LGA: District Council of Lower Eyre Peninsula
- Location: 16 km (9.9 mi) northwest of Port Lincoln

Government
  - State electorate: Flinders
  - Federal division: Grey

Population
  - Total: 133 (SAL 2021)
- Postcode: 5607
Localities around Coomunga
Fountain	Pearlah	Greenpatch
Uley	Coomunga	Tootenilla
	Duck Ponds	Hawson

Coomunga is a rural locality near Port Lincoln on lower Eyre Peninsula in South Australia. Both the Flinders Highway and the Eyre Peninsula Railway cross the locality from northwest to southeast. Coomunga Station was 21.6km from the Port Lincoln terminus.

The area is predominantly farmland. Other businesses in the area include a small winery and the West Coast Memorial Park and funeral directors. Formal boundaries were established in October 2003.

The railway from Port Lincoln opened as far as Coomunga in early June 1907, with the initial development extending to Cummins later that year. The station cease to be used long ago, and the entire line has been dormant since 2019.
