= Morgan Casket =

Medieval Italian carved ivory and bone box

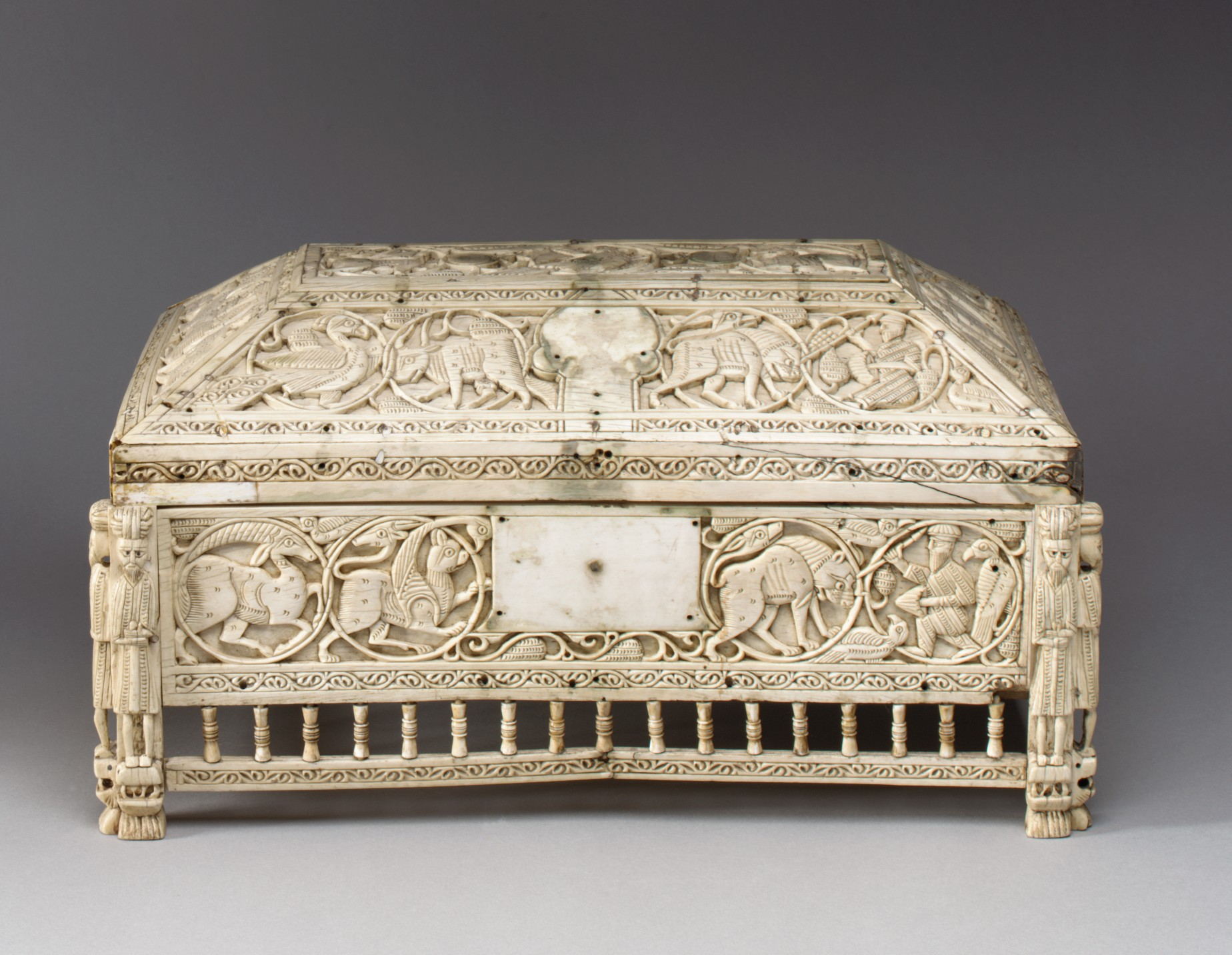
- Year: c. 11th or 12th century
- Medium: ivory
- Subject: A most beautiful example of skilled carving in ivory from Norman Sicily
- Dimensions: 22.3 cm × 20 cm × 38.6 cm (8.8 in × 7.9 in × 15.2 in)
- Location: Metropolitan Museum of Art; New York

The Morgan Casket is a medieval casket from Southern Italy, probably Norman Sicily. However, it reflects the Islamic style of the Fatimid Caliphate in Egypt, the culturally dominant power in the Western Mediterranean at the time. It is made from carved ivory and bone over a wooden framework, and is dated to the 11th–12th centuries AD. It was donated to the New York Metropolitan Museum of Art by the J.P. Morgan estate in 1917. The casket has many images of men and animals, vines and rosettes, and one image of a woman. The carvings are considered among the most beautiful carvings from southern Italy during Norman rule.

The overall dimensions are 8 7/8 in. (22.3 cm) high, 15 3/16 in. (38.6 cm) wide, 7 7/8 in. (20 cm) deep and the lid is 2 3/4 in. (7 cm) high. It was part of the donation by J. P. Morgan's estate in 1917.

== Description ==
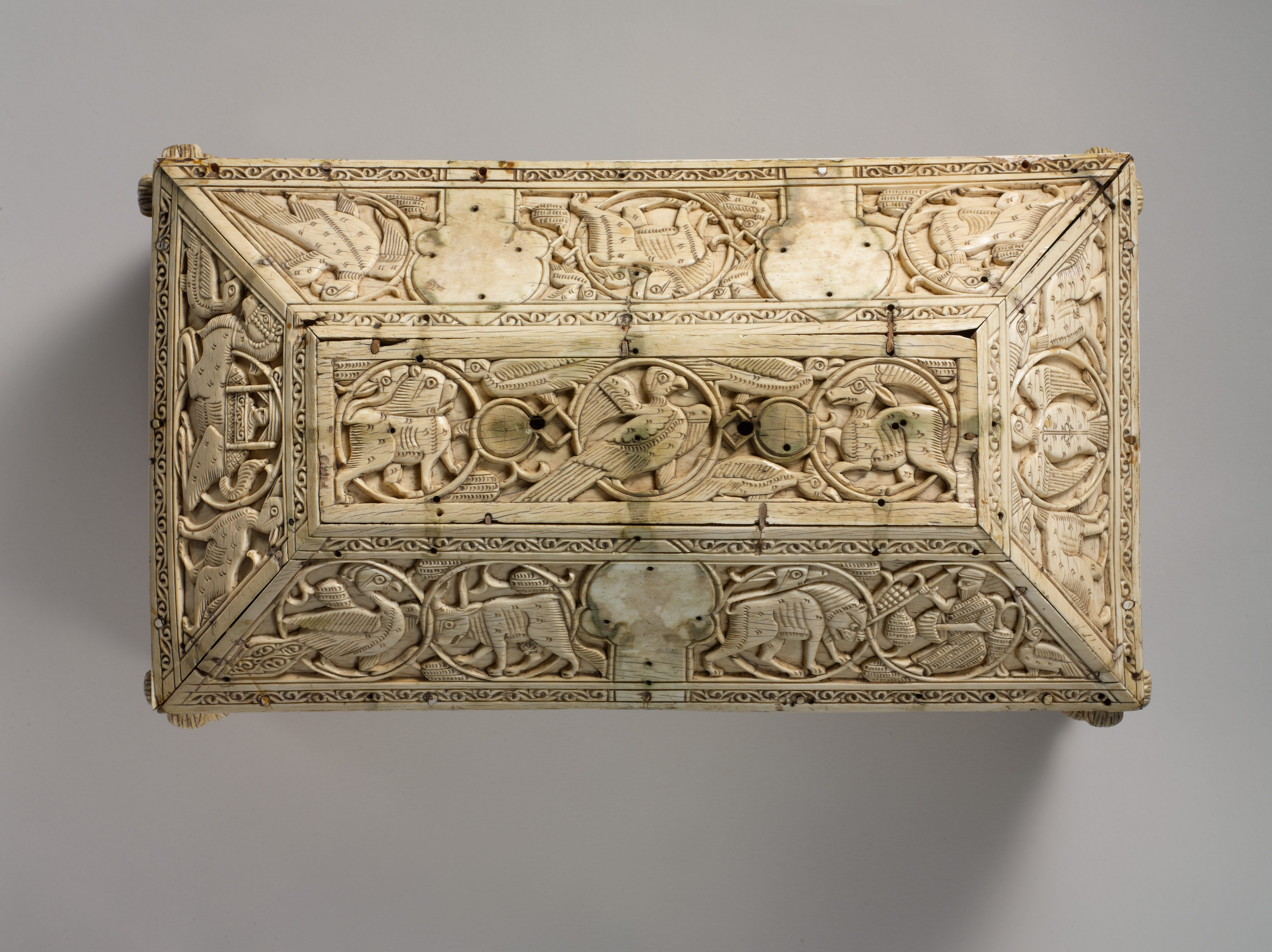
View of the top of the casket

The casket is made of carved ivory and bone, over a wooden framework. All the visible faces have carvings, and standing sword-wielding men in turbans are placed at the corners. The wider faces of the casket have animals and hunters with spears. The only woman shown (end to the left of the missing lock) is inside a curtained howdah on a camel. The style derives from Fatimid art, but the casket was probably made in Norman Sicily. It is similar to carvings on the ceiling of the Cappella Palatina in Palermo, and boxes in other collections. The structure of the casket is itself made up of nine panels, four of which make up the body while five make up the lid.

The casket is one of the least studied of the Norman carvings. It is one of the best examples of ivory carved with small delicate details reflective of Fatimid works but also reflecting influences from France, Italy and Germany. The territory of Norman Sicily was important from an artistic perspective in ancient Greek and Roman times.

=== Role of women ===
Similarly, the way the human figures and the animals are shown illustrates information about gender traditions. The aggressive male behavior against the animals causes the beasts to attempt to defend themselves. These scenes illustrate hostility between the males and the animals suggesting an aggressive masculine representation. In contrast to the fierce male image, the illustrations of the woman suggest peace, respect, tenderness, and reverence as shown by the image on the Morgan Casket of a camel that kneels to a woman. There is a clear distinction between the male and female actions that illustrate the gender attitudes. The males have leading roles that emphasize their superior place in the court, compared to the more idle women.

The woman is modestly veiled and positioned away from the males on the casket. She appears fragile with a more passive role in the court as compared with the male’s courageous activities. The woman is in isolation protected from the chaos. Her image on the casket is consistent with traditional gender roles of the dominant male and the docile female.

The base was built with a wooden core and the ivory panels were attached with pegs. With the ivory stained, painted, or gilded the finished box was beautiful and suitable for royal uses. The flat lids would either slide open or use hinges. With truncated pyramids, such as the Morgan Casket, the lids were hinged.

=== Rebuilding the casket ===
But the casket may not be all original. The original parts are the back, ends, most of the top, half of the bottom, and possibly part of the iron fittings. Except for the portion of the irons, these pieces likely belong together but have been reassembled in their entirety. Modern restorations include the front, the upper left corner and the strip along the back of the lid, half of the bottom, the escutcheon plate and maybe other iron fittings. Even with the reassembly of these parts and restoration of others, the casket is one of the finest examples of the superb era of Gothic carvings.

== Islamic influence ==
Sicily was conquered by the Muslims in 902, an effort that started in 827. They deposed the control of the Byzantines and remained in power until the 1200s when the Normans gained control.

The Morgan Casket was made in Norman Sicily and subject to extensive Islamic influence. The year 622 the flight of Muhammad and his followers from Mecca to Medina marks the beginning of the Islamic calendar. From the Arabian Peninsula the Muslim conquest soon spread to the surrounding areas in the Byzantine and Persian Sasanian empires. The Arabs were successful in establishing Islam from Spain east to India and China by 714. Under Mohammad's successors they ruled over territory ranging from the Atlantic to China while enjoying wealth from the lands. Starting with its pre-Islamic origin Islamic art has undergone major exchanges of artistic traditions with Europe and the Far East so much so that Islamic culture has both received and distributed the cultural influences from many originating places.

People, including artists and craftsmen, migrated as a result of war and new opportunities available to them. Also, diplomatic contacts, trade, and gift exchange occurred in lands as spread out as areas along the Mediterranean, Central Asia and Western Asia and lands along the Indian Ocean. Artists and craftsmen who had worked under the patronage of Sasanian and Byzantine patrons used the same practices when working for Muslim patrons. Islamic lands were conquered by Turks, Mongols and others who brought their native foreign scholars, artists and artistic traditions.

Both the largest group of carvings and some of the most interesting were the over fifty caskets and the many single panels made by Byzantine carvers and their immediate successors.

== Ivory ==
Ivory was used to construct the Morgan Casket and other items intended for royal use because of its durability. The smoothness of the texture made it ideal for carving, but its rarity resulted in ivory objects being expensive. Due to the expense and the characteristics of the ivory it was used for intricate carvings for items made for royal families. The precious items were intended as gifts to other royals, gifts for important events such as weddings and passage of age ceremonies, and gifts for special people.

=== Images ===
Images carved on the casket are dressed in royal costumes and mostly consist of men in pursuit of or defending an attack from a wild animal. The lid of the Morgan Casket has a roundel with an eagle spreading its wings. The strength and courage of the males are illustrated by the carvings so that the wealth of the family and its capabilities of defending its territory are all suggested by the beautiful ivory casket. Both the decorations with figures and the ivory material of the Islamic items reinforce the role of male sovereignty.

One element of the decoration almost uniformly present is a border around the panels whether they were rectangular or square. The borders consist of a rosettes within circles with arrow heads placed above or below the triangular areas at the point of contact of the circles. The repetitiveness of the border images could be monotonous but that was avoided through making small changes in the shape of the rosettes or changing the cutting depth. In a few cases the medallion-heads and rosettes were alternated. The many different decorations on the casket include medallions of interlaced vine scrolls with hunters, beasts, and birds in them. The bearded figures at the corners seem to be guarding the images. The images carved into the panels of the Morgan Casket enable studying the articulation of the figures, their proportion, and how the feet and hands are displayed.

=== Origin ===
The Oriental nature of the decoration is clear, it has differences in style from other Mohammedan work from Egypt, Syria, or Mesopotamia. The Morgan ivories (including the Morgan Casket) are more similar to the art of Moorish Spain or that of southern Italy in the eleventh and twelfth centuries, where the Normans, through the conquest of Sicily, had introduced the Arabic art of their day. Many Mohammedan artists were employed under the Norman kings.

The carvings on the ivories include images relating to the royal court to emphasize the objects’ status for royals and include low-relief images of royal figures, activities of the males in the royal family, and animal motifs symbolic of the royals. For example, lions, gazelles, bulls and eagles are carved into the casket as they were commonly symbols of royal power. The eagle is a sign royalty and is important to illustrate the noble quality of the box. All images are carved in extensive detail. With the expensive ivory material and the creative carvings, the ivories prove the artistic significance and wealth of the Islamic royal courts.

The decorations on the casket are elaborately carved images of royals hunting animals in the traditional ways of royal life. The images shown of men hunting exotic beasts and birds with spears are repeated on the casket. Hunting was one of the leisure pursuits of the kings and the royal court and implied authority, skill, and courage to challenge these wild and ferocious animals. The hunting scenes illustrate the superiority of the royal family to the animals suggesting the same characteristics in their ruling of the kingdom. Powerful rulers used the hunting motifs to assert their superiority and bravery in hunting, as well as in the more formal aspect of ruling their kingdom. These scenes also show their power against enemies.

=== Role of women ===
Similarly, the way the human figures and the animals are shown illustrates information about gender traditions. The aggressive male behavior against the animals causes the beasts to attempt to defend themselves. These scenes illustrate hostility between the males and the animals suggesting an aggressive masculine representation. In contrast to the fierce male image, the illustrations of the woman suggest peace, respect, tenderness, and reverence as shown by the image on the Morgan Casket of a camel that kneels to a woman. There is a clear distinction between the male and female actions that illustrate the gender attitudes. The males have leading roles that emphasize their superior place in the court, compared to the more idle women.

The woman is modestly veiled and positioned away from the males on the casket. She appears fragile with a more passive role in the court as compared with the male’s courageous activities. The woman is in isolation protected from the chaos. Her image on the casket is consistent with traditional gender roles of the dominant male and the docile female.

== Provenance ==
The casket was donated after his death in 1913 by the estate of J. Pierpont Morgan during the years 1913 to 1917. Galerie A. Imbert, Rome, owned it until 1910 when it was sold to Morgan. Krings and Lempertz, Cologne, October 27–29, 1904, no. 1055. Sold to Imbert. Bourgeois Frères, Cologne, until 1904. Sale to Krings and Lempertz. G. Vermeersch, Brussels (in 1882).

An additional source describes the provenance with different details. The casket was the gift from Mr. Morgan's collection and had been in the Oppenheim, Spitzer, and Meyrick collections. But, in addition it was included in the catalogues of both the Oppenheim and Spitzer collections in its current day appearance. Another has noted that there is a record in 1836 in The Gentlemen's Magazine. At that time Sir Samuel Rush Meyrick described the collection of antiquities given him by Francis Douce’s will. The collection included a casket that exactly corresponds with the Morgan Casket except the front was lacking.

== Art historical references ==
- A similar casket exists in the Treasury of the Basilica of Saint Servatius in Maastricht, the Netherlands. The Maastricht Siculo-Arabic chest is smaller than the Morgan Casket but the carvings are almost identical, including the corner figures.
- Another ivory casket in the Museum of Islamic Art, Berlin is more or less the same size as the Morgan Casket but misses both the 'balustrade' along the lower edge, as well as the corner figures. This casket is said to originate from Speyer Cathedral.
- Various olifants in museum collections worldwide are carved similarly and may originate from the same workshop.

== Images ==
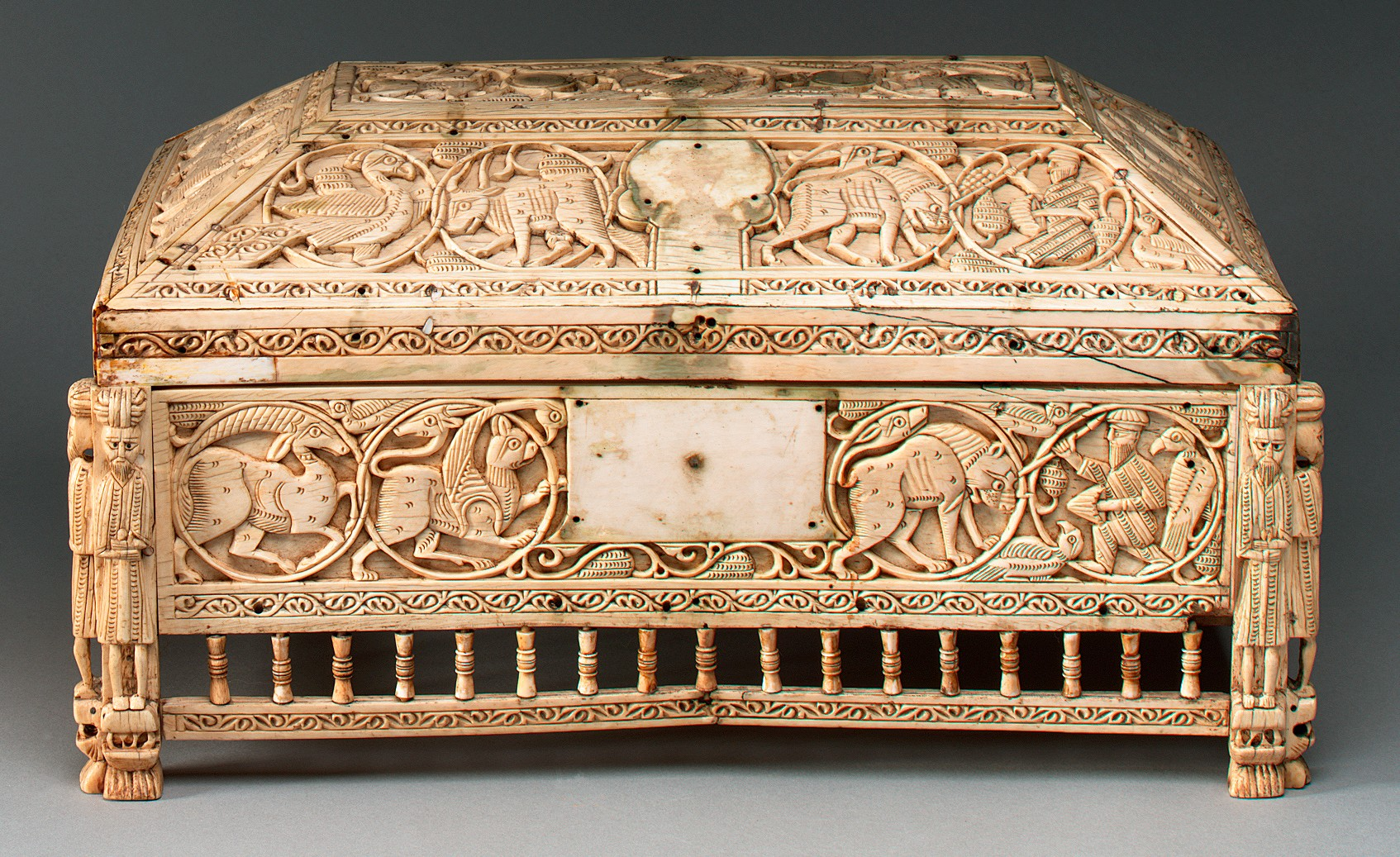
Close up view of the front showing the fine detail in the carvings.

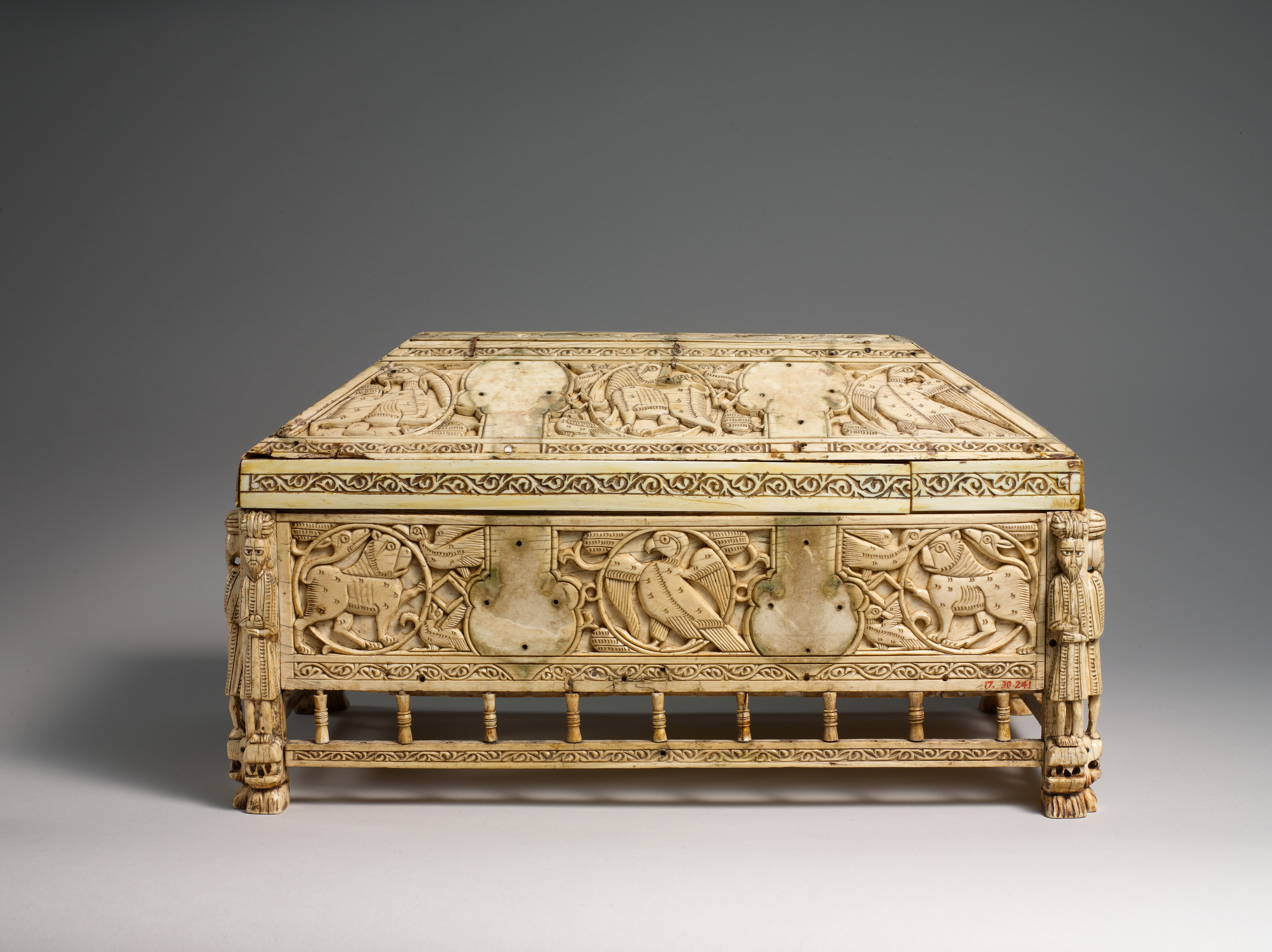
Back of the casket showing the location of the hinges

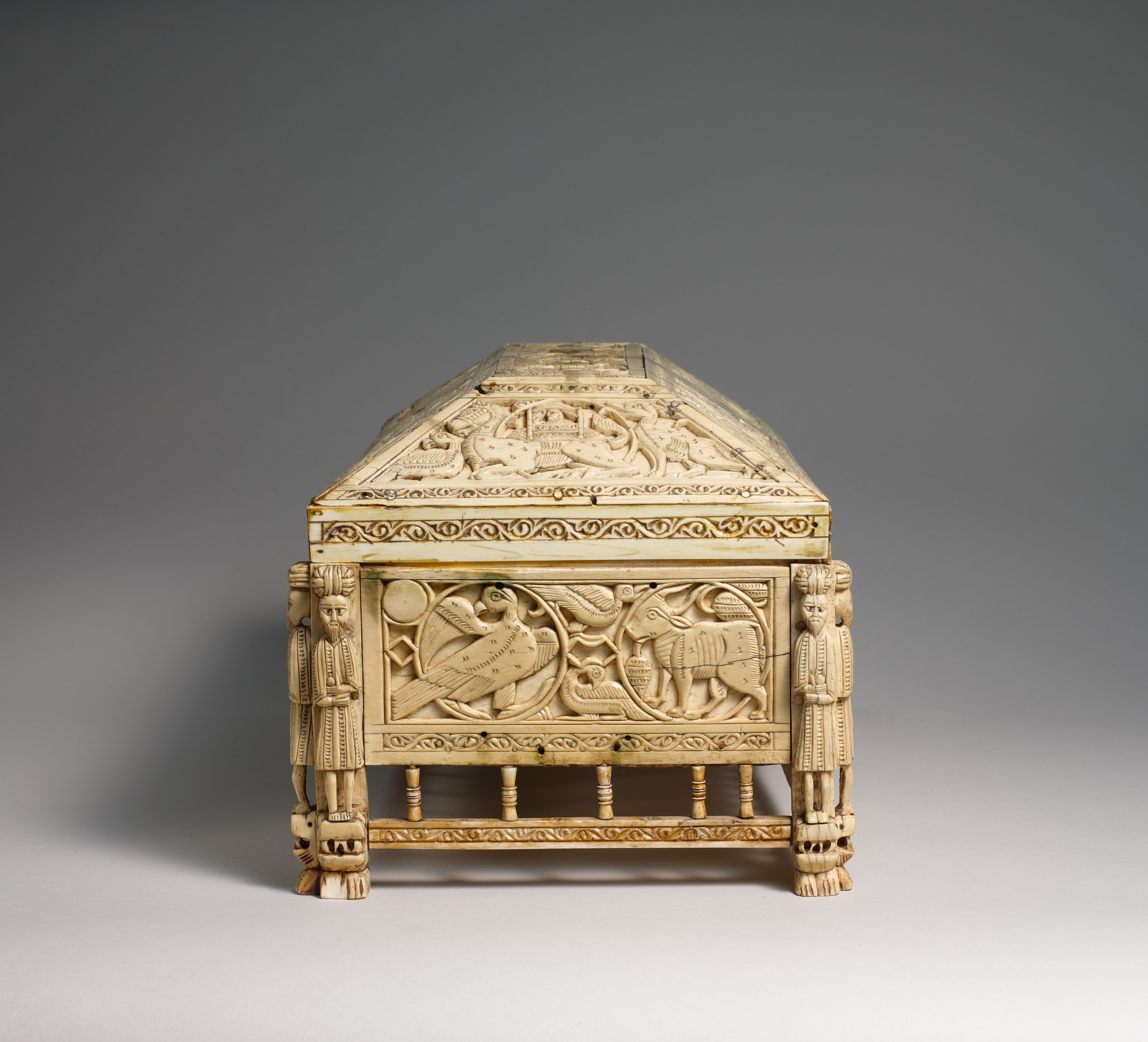
