= Sleaford Mere Conservation Park =

Conservation park in South Australia

- IUCN category III (natural monument or feature)
- Location within South Australia
- Location: South Australia, Sleaford
- Nearest city: Port Lincoln
- Coordinates: 34°50′20″S 135°44′27″E
- Area: 5.95 km^{2} (2.30 sq mi)
- Established: 20 November 1969
- Visitors: ‘low visitor use’ (in 2009)
- Governing body: Department for Environment and Water

Sleaford Mere Conservation Park, formerly the Sleaford Mere National Park, is a protected area in the Australian state of South Australia located in the locality of Sleaford on the Jussieu Peninsula at the south eastern tip of Eyre Peninsula about 15 kilometres (9.3 mi) south west of Port Lincoln.

The conservation park consists of Sleaford Mere, a permanent saline lake, and a quantity of adjoining land in section 36 of the cadastral unit of the Hundred of Sleaford. It shares boundaries with the Lincoln National Park on its north and east sides along with a parcel of land to its immediate west.

The land under protection was originally established as the Sleaford Mere National Park on 20 November 1969 under the National Parks Act 1966. On 27 April 1972, the national park was reconstituted as the Sleaford Mere Conservation Park under the National Parks and Wildlife Act 1972. As of 2018, it covered an area of 5.95 square kilometres (2.30 sq mi).

The following statement of significance was published in 1980:

Sleaford Mere Conservation Park preserves a picturesque saline lake, which provides feeding habitat for a number of waterbird species, including chestnut teal which are known to breed in the park. Marine fish, including a large, land-locked population of skates are found in the Lake.

The conservation park is classified as an IUCN Category III protected area. In 1980, it was listed on the now-defunct Register of the National Estate.

== See also ==
- Protected areas of South Australia
