= Troyes Casket =

Byzantine carved ivory box housed in cathedral in France

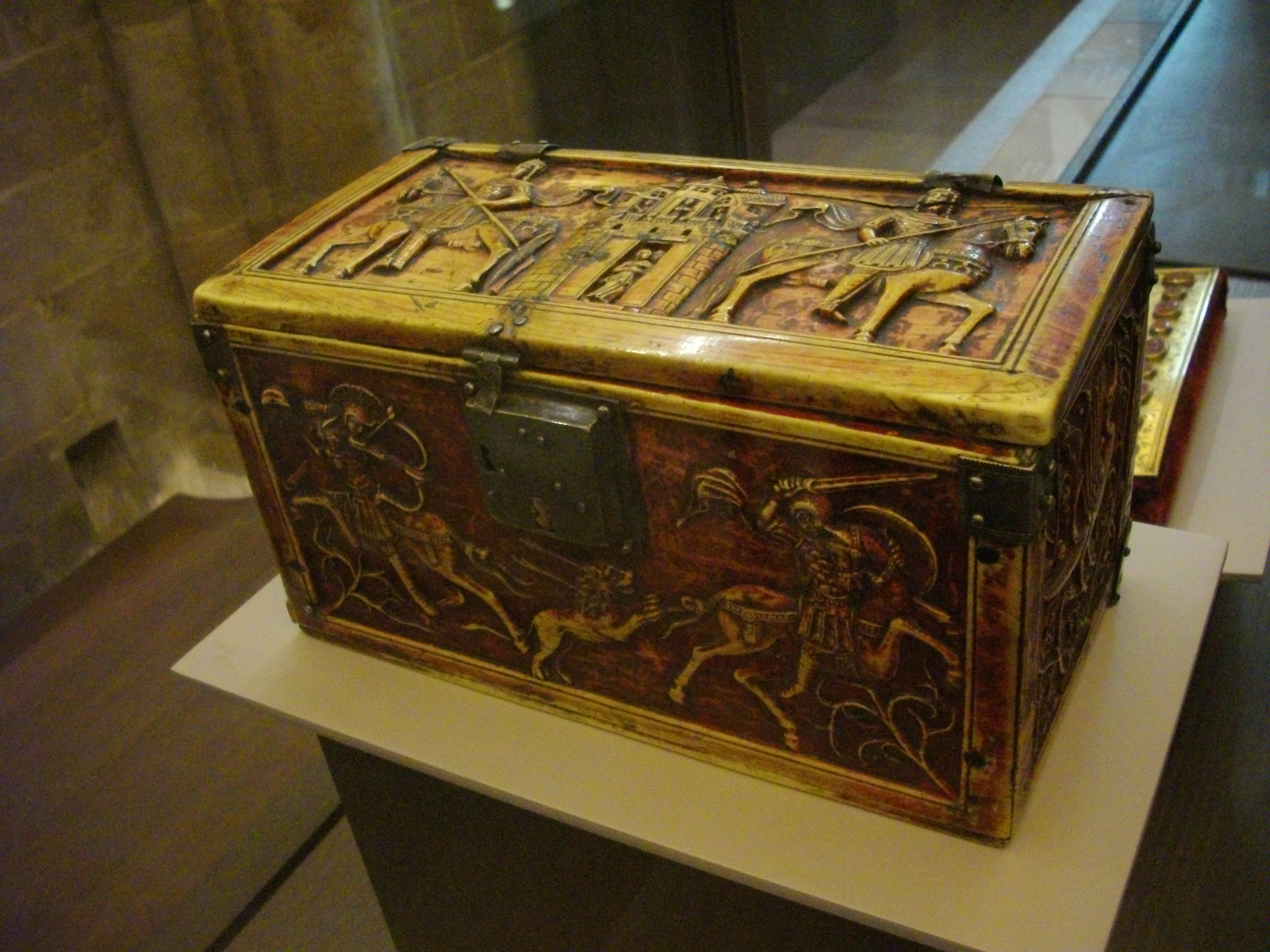
The Troyes Casket

The Troyes Casket is a carved ivory box of Byzantine origin. It is housed in the treasury of the Troyes Cathedral in Troyes, France.

== History ==
The Troyes Casket was carved during Byzantium's Macedonian Dynasty, in the 10th or 11th century. The artisan who carved the casket is unknown, as is the identity of the person it was created for, although it is believed to have been crafted for a member of the imperial court due to its themes and the expensive materials it is constructed from.

== Physical description ==
The Troyes Casket measures 13 × 26 × 13 centimeters. It has six intact, 1 cm thick panels of solid ivory, five of which feature carved inscriptions. The ivory panels are dyed a purplish-red color. Purple was considered a royal color in Byzantium, and only members of the imperial family and court were allowed to wear or use it.

The long front panels of the casket are carved with scenes of hunting and martial skill. The carving on the front panel of the casket depicts two men on horseback hunting a lion. The two hunters are dressed as soldiers, carrying bows and swords and wearing lamellar armor. The back panel depicts a lone individual spearing a wild boar. The shorter end panels depict, or were heavily inspired by representations of, the mythical Chinese bird known as the fenghuang. These images are very similar to those created in China at the time, although they were carved in Constantinople. The carver's intention behind including this exotic imagery is debated, but unknown.

The lid is flat and hinged, and can be opened upwards. On the lid panel, two men on horses are carved riding away from a walled city, which may be intended to represent Constantinople. These riders are also wearing armor, in a style modelled after Greco-Roman generals, and they carry spears. The two figures are believed to represent an unknown emperor and his heir, carrying out the action of expanding their empire through war.

== Gallery ==
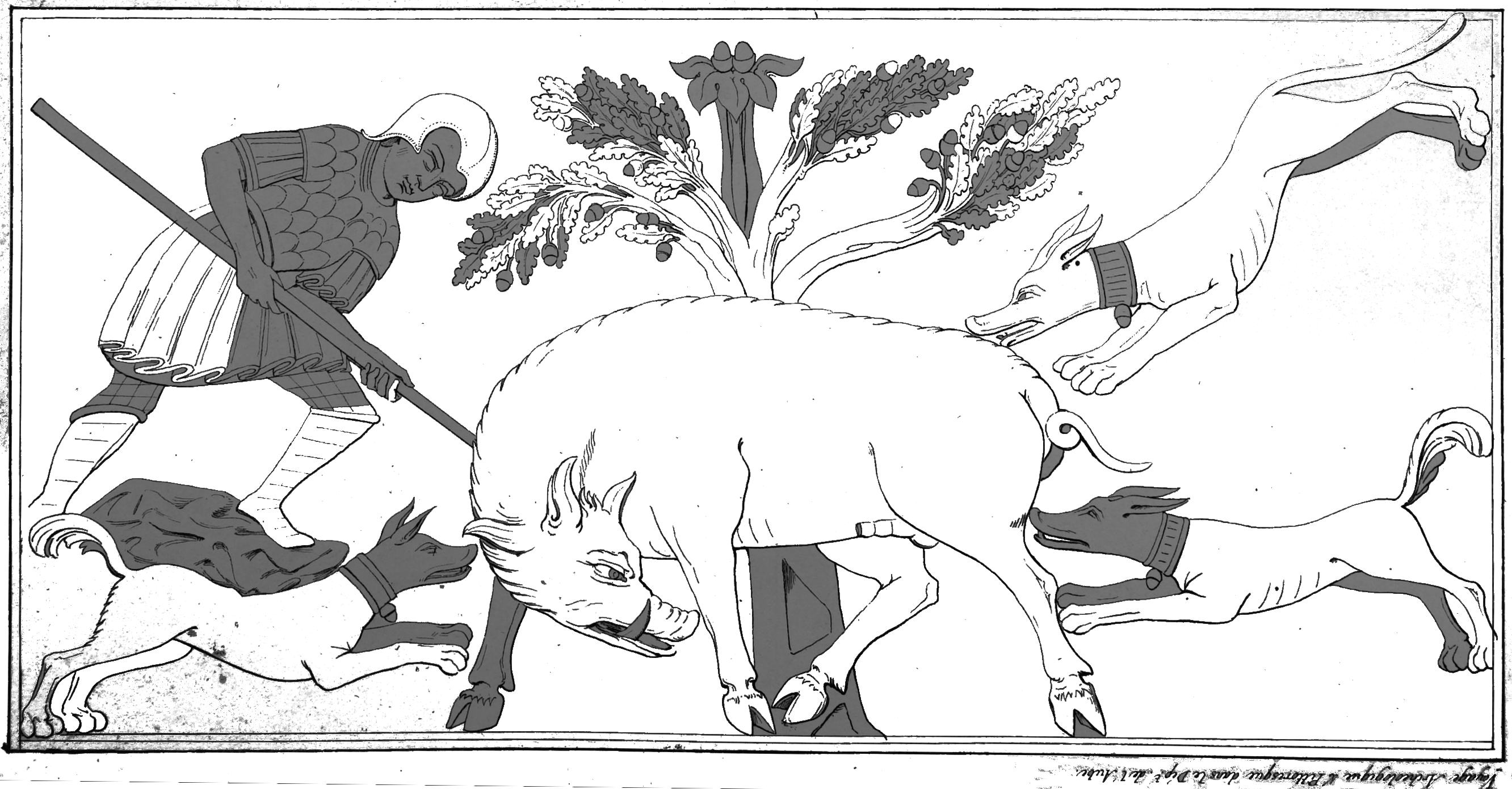
Illustration of the back panel.

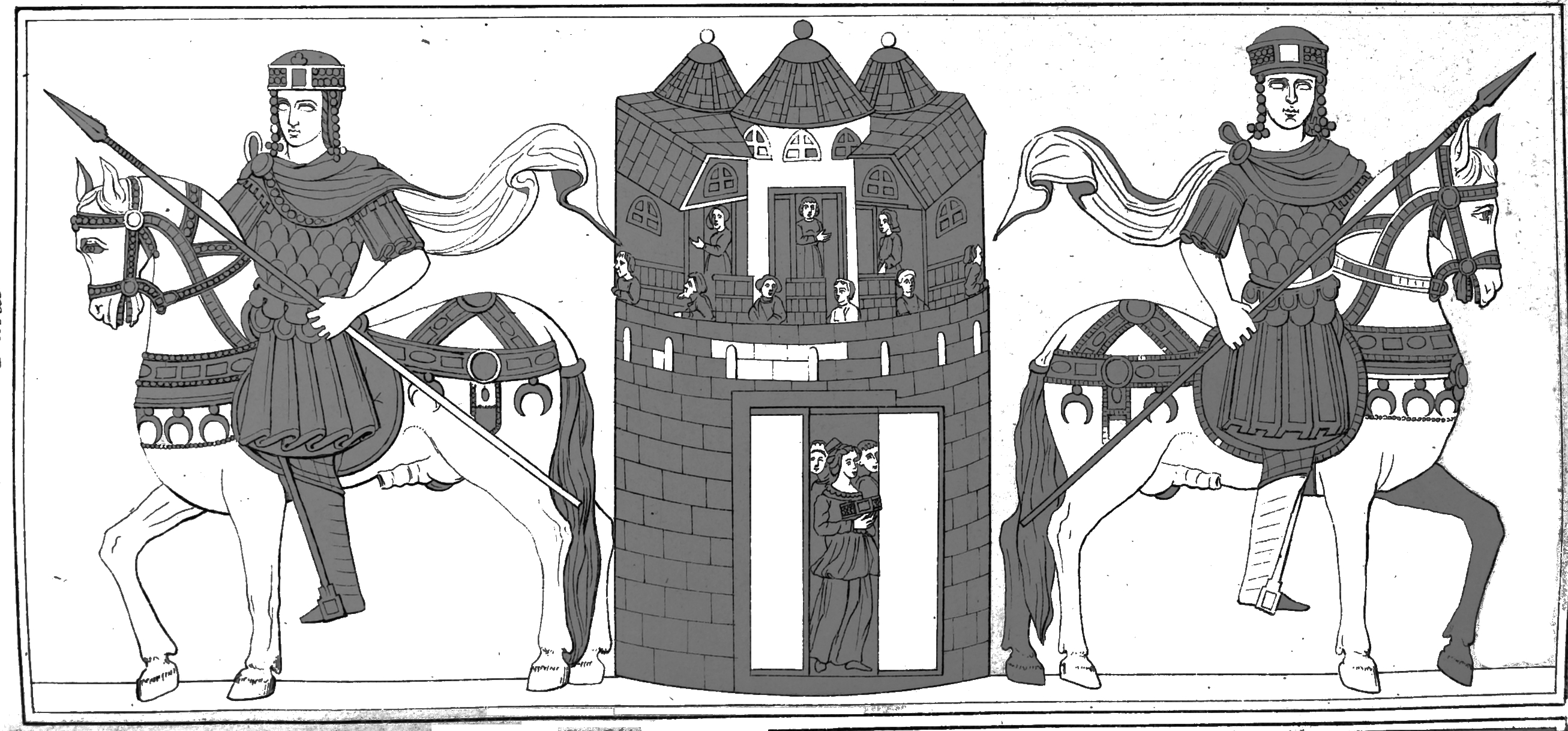
Illustration of the lid of the casket.

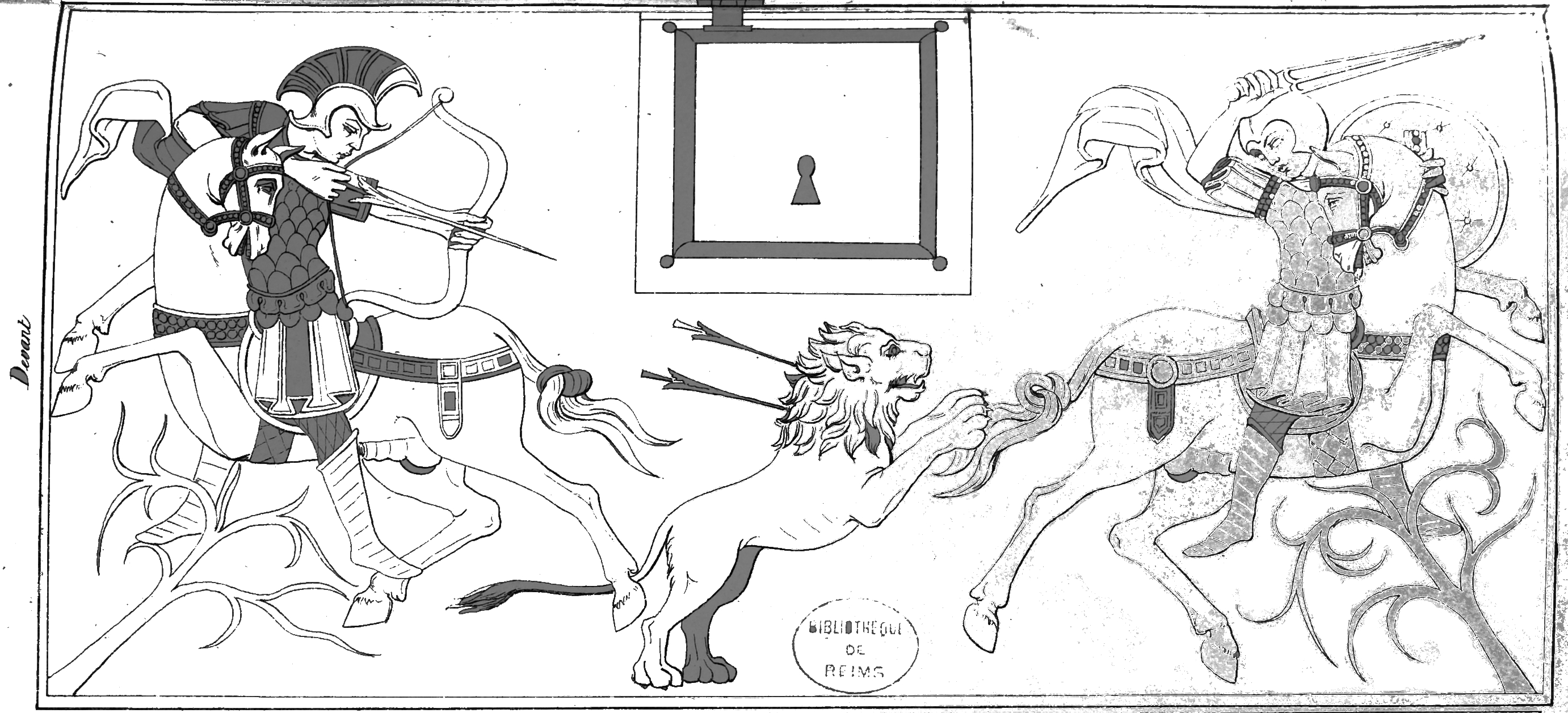
Illustration of the front panel.

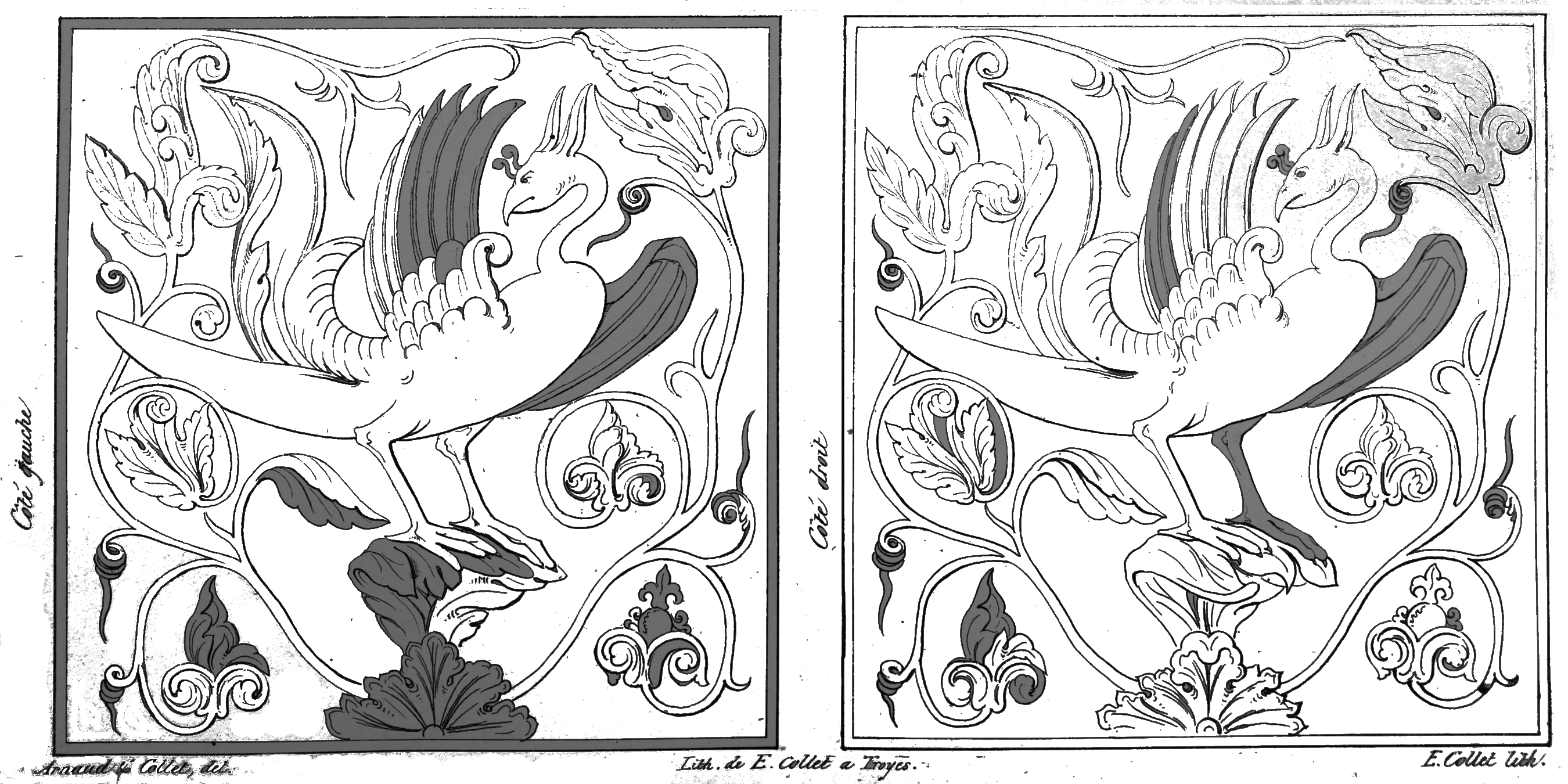
Illustrations of the side panels.
