= Cape Carnot =

Cape Carnot South Australia
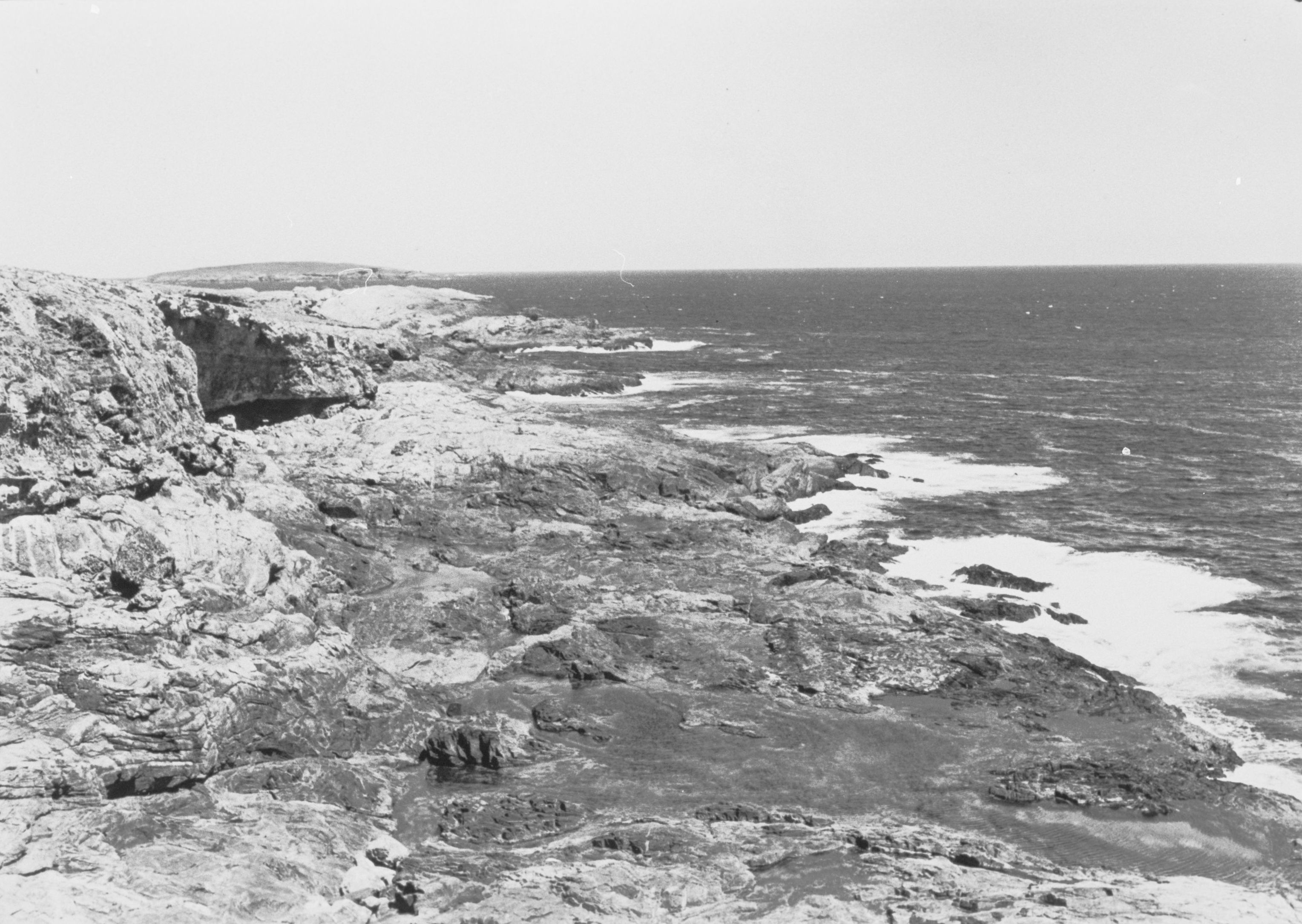
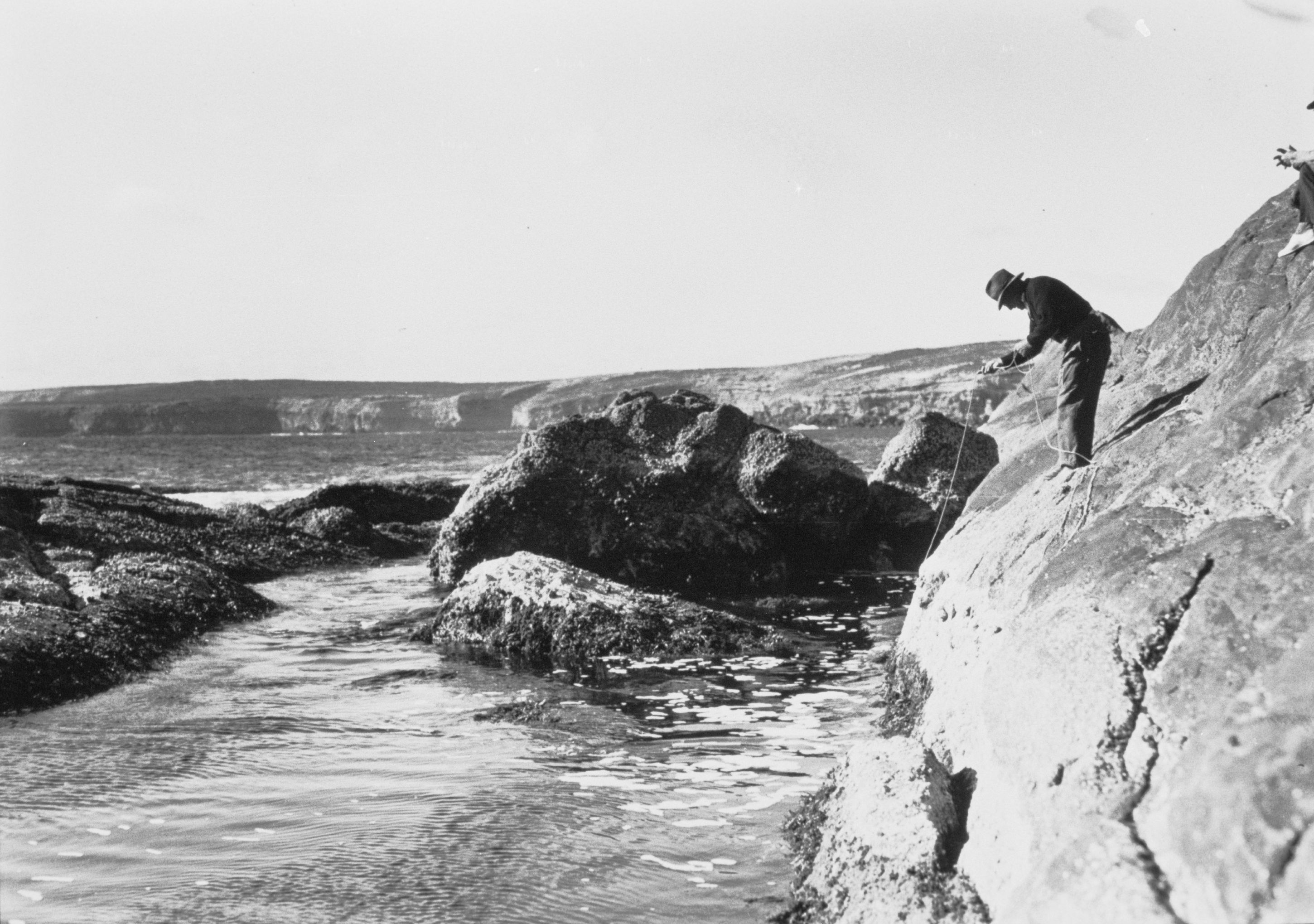

- Coordinates: 34°56′47.1″S 135°37′32.2″E
- Elevation: 89 m (292 ft)
- Location: 30 km (19 mi) south west of Port Lincoln

Cape Carnot (French: Cap Carnot) is a headland in the Australian state of South Australia located on the west side of the southern tip of Eyre Peninsula about 30 kilometres (19 miles) south west of the city of Port Lincoln. The Eyre Peninsula has a double tip; the other tip, 3 nautical miles (5.6 kilometres; 3.5 miles) to the east, is Cape Wiles. Cape Carnot is one of a number of coastal features first discovered but not subsequently named by Matthew Flinders in February 1802 and which remained unnamed. In 1913, the Government of South Australia gave the unnamed feature the name proposed by the Baudin expedition when it visited in April 1802. The name Cape Carnot honours Lazare Carnot who is notable as a "French mathematician, general and statesman, who played a prominent part in the French Revolution and the Napoleonic era".

The cape is considered by the Australian Hydrographic Service to be the eastern end of the Great Australian Bight. Since 2012, the waters adjoining its shoreline are within a habitat protection zone in the Thorny Passage Marine Park.
