= Cammin Casket =

11th-century Scandinavian casket

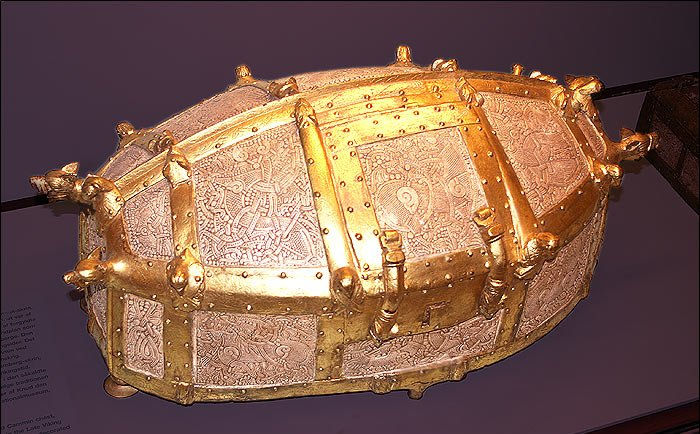
Copy of the Cammin casket in the Nationalmuseet in Copenhagen. More copies are in Kastalakyrkan in Kungälv, Göteborg City Museum and Bohusläns museum.

The Cammin Casket was made in southern Scandinavia around the year 1000 and decorated in the Mammen style. It held the relics of Cordula of Cologne. Until the Second World War, it was on display in the Cathedral of Saint John in Cammin in Western Pomerania (now Konkatedra św. Jana Chrzciciela in Kamień Pomorski in north-western Poland). The box disappeared during the war, when the church's interior was almost completely destroyed by fire. Several copies survive.
