= Sleaford Bay =

Bight in South Australia

- Danana (Banggarla); Kuya Bidni (Nauo)
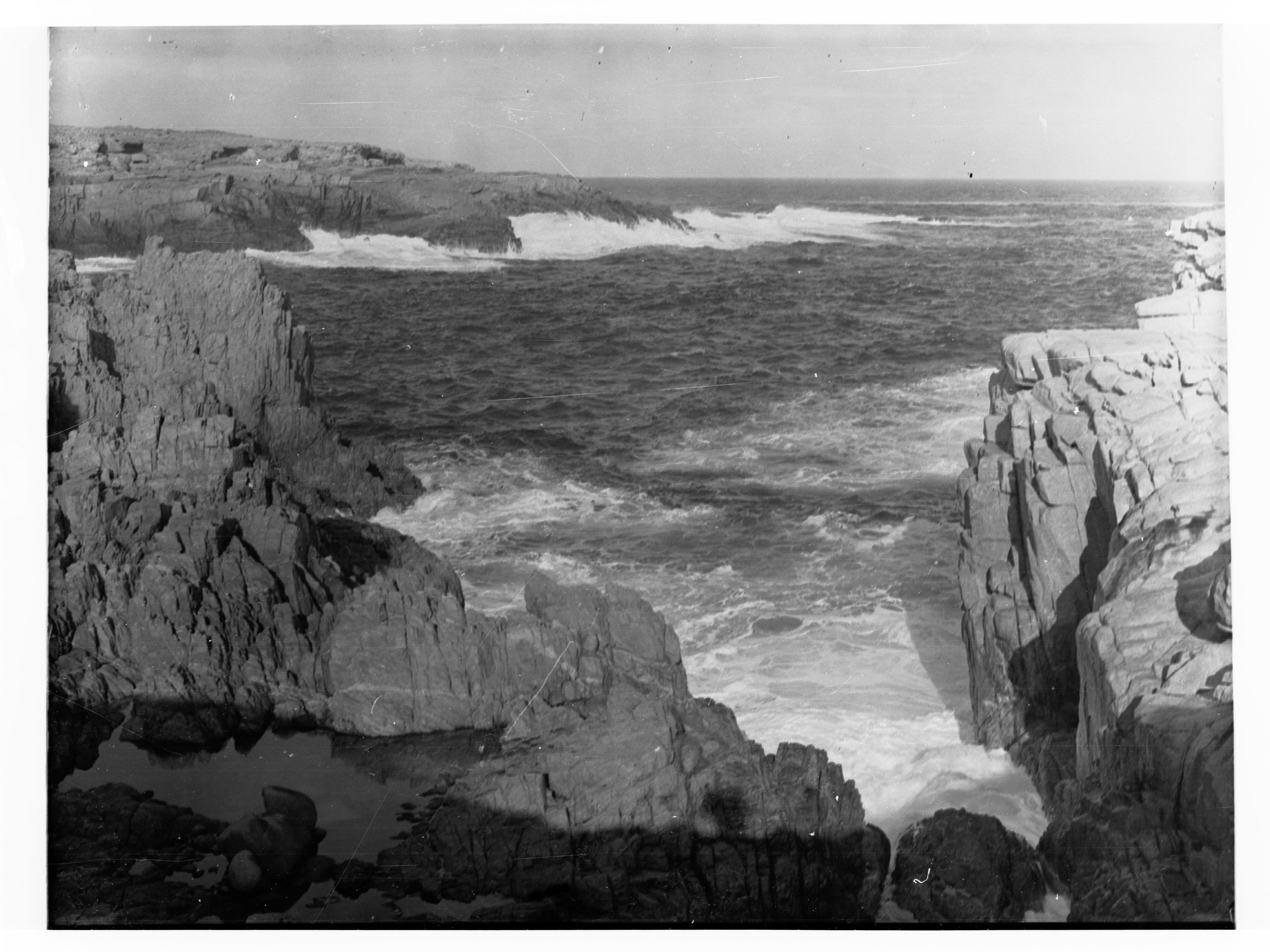
- Sleaford Bay, ca 1935

- Location in South Australia
- Location: Eyre Peninsula, South Australia
- Coordinates: 34°53′54″S 135°46′02″E
- Type: Bay
- Etymology: Sleaford, Lincolnshire
- Basin countries: Australia
- Designation: Marine park
- Max. length: about 16 kilometres (9.9 mi)
- Max. width: about 9 kilometres (5.6 mi)
- Max. depth: about 53 metres (174 ft)
- Islands: one
- Settlements: Sleaford; Lincoln National Park

Sleaford Bay is a bay located in the Australian state of South Australia on the southern coast of Eyre Peninsula. It was named by the British navigator, Matthew Flinders in 1802.

== Extent & description ==
Sleaford Bay is located on the south coast of Eyre Peninsula in South Australia about 21 kilometres (13 mi) south-west of the municipal seat of Port Lincoln.

It lies between the headland of Cape Wiles at its western extremity and headland of Cape Tournefort at its eastern extremity. A subsidiary bay named Fishery Bay is located on its west side about 2 nautical miles (3.7 km; 2.3 mi) north of Cape Wiles.

== History ==
The bay was named after the town of Sleaford in Lincolnshire, England by the British navigator, Matthew Flinders in 1802.

The Barngarla name for Sleaford Bay is Dhanana.

The Baudin expedition who visited after Flinders gave it two names – Baudin used the name Anse des Nerlans while Peron and Freycinet revised it to Baie Lavoisier after Baudin's death.

A whaling station located on the coastline within Fishery Bay was in operation from 1839 to 1841.

== Settlements and infrastructure ==
The coastline of Sleaford Bay is occupied by the locality of Sleaford in the west and by the locality of Lincoln National Park in the east.

As of 2005, port infrastructure within the bay consisted of a boat ramp located in Fishery Bay.

=== Proposed seawater desalination plant ===
In 2018, a proposal to construct a 3 gigalitre per year seawater desalination plant at Sleaford Bay was announced. Land was purchased in July and the project was expected to cost $80 million to complete. The location is one of several prospects previously earmarked by SA Water in 2009. In 2020, the site in the north of the bay near Sleaford Mere Conservation Park was ruled too costly. After a second site closer to Port Lincoln was opposed by commercial fisheries in 2021, a committee was set up which chose a site between Fishery Bay and Sleaford Bay in 2022, with the capacity increased to 5.3-gigalitres. Most recently SA Water has decided to build within Proper Bay near Port Lincoln. This is being resisted as consultation and native title research has not been completed and the decision goes against the advice of the local management board and its findings. The area is known to frequently have low to no tidal flushing during Dodge tide events, particularly during the hottest months, which has raised grave concerns from commercial operators and some marine biologists should the area become adversely affected. An announcement that the initial Desalination plant size is projected to expand significantly in the future also creates uncertainty within the broad local community.

== Protected area status ==
The Thorny Passage Marine Park occupies the full extent of the bay while the Lincoln National Park extents to Mean Low Water Mark on its eastern side.
