= Sleaford, South Australia =

Sleaford South Australia
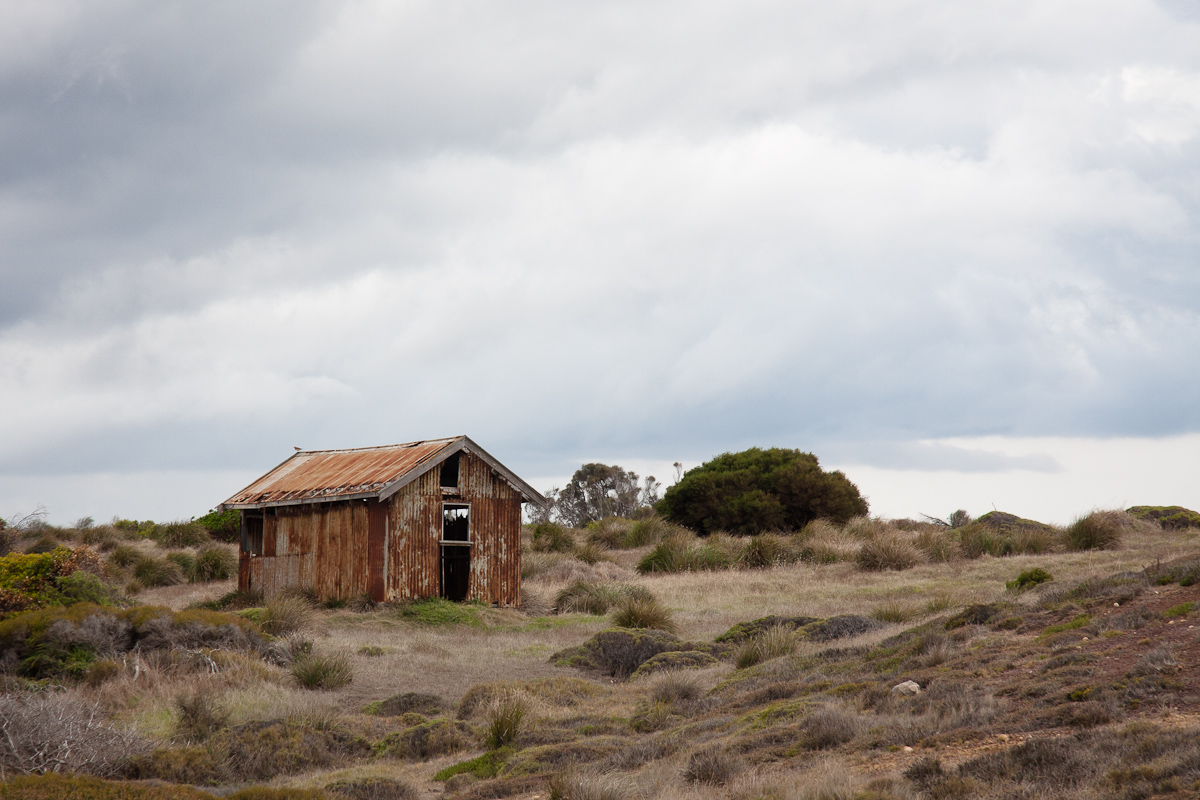
- Old shack in Sleaford

- Coordinates: 34°51′40″S 135°38′49″E
- Population: 31 (SAL 2021)
- Established: 1871
- Postcode(s): 5607
- Time zone: ACST (UTC+9:30)
  - Summer (DST): ACST (UTC+10:30)
- Location: 260 km (162 mi) W of Adelaide city centre; 17 km (11 mi) SW of Port Lincoln
- LGA(s): District Council of Lower Eyre Peninsula
- Region: Eyre Western
- County: Flinders
- State electorate(s): Flinders
- Federal division(s): Grey
Mean max temp	Mean min temp	Annual rainfall
21.2 °C; 70 °F	11.3 °C; 52 °F	383.2 mm 15.1 in
Suburbs around Sleaford:
	Uley; Tulka	Port Lincoln (water body)
Great Australian Bight	Sleaford	Lincoln National Park
	Great Australian Bight
- Footnotes: Location; Coordinates; Climate; Adjoining localities

Sleaford is a locality in the Australian state of South Australia located at the southern tip of the Eyre Peninsula overlooking the Great Australian Bight about 260 kilometres (160 miles) west of the state capital of Adelaide and about 17 kilometres (11 miles) west of the municipal seat of Port Lincoln.

The boundaries of the locality were created in October 2003 for the “long established name” which is derived from Sleaford Bay. The boundary with the locality of Tulka was altered in both 2006 and 2011.

Sleaford consists of land at the southern tip of Eyre Peninsula located south of a line running west from the western end of Proper Bay within the natural harbour known as Port Lincoln, and which is bounded from the west to the south-east by the coastline overlooking the Great Australian Bight including the western half of Sleaford Bay and whose eastern boundary is located in the western part of the Jussieu Peninsula.

The extent of the locality aligns with the cadastral Hundred of Sleaford with the exception of parts of the locality of Tulka. The Hundred of Sleaford covers an area of 190 square kilometres (72 sq mi), was proclaimed in 1871 by Governor Fergusson and which was named after Sleaford Bay.

Land use within the locality consists of land zoned for both agricultural and conservation purposes including the following protected areas - the part of the Lincoln National Park located within the Hundred of Sleaford and the Sleaford Mere Conservation Park.

Sleaford includes the site of the former Fishery Bay Whaling Station at Fishery Bay on the coast of Sleaford Bay, which is listed in the South Australian Heritage Register.

The 2016 Australian census which was conducted in August 2016 reported that Sleaford had a population of 46 people.

Sleaford is located within the federal Division of Grey, the state electoral district of Flinders and the local government area of the District Council of Lower Eyre Peninsula.

The Whalers Way Orbital Launch Complex is located in Sleaford.
