= Port Lincoln Prison =

Prison in Port Lincoln, Australia

Coordinates: 34°42′16.73″S 135°47′51.09″E

- Location in South Australia
- Location: Pound Lane, Duck Ponds, South Australia
- Status: Operational
- Security class: Low to medium security
- Capacity: 90
- Opened: 1966
- Managed by: Department for Correctional Services

Port Lincoln Prison is an Australian prison on the Eyre Peninsula located in Duck Ponds, South Australia about 257 kilometres (160 mi) west of the state capital of Adelaide and about 6 kilometres (3.7 mi) north-west of the regional city of Port Lincoln. It was opened in 1966.

Sheep and cattle are raised at the prison providing work for low security prisoners involved in running an agricultural business. It has a capacity of 90 prisoners.
