= Great Flinders Football League =

- Most recent season or competition: 2025
- Formerly: 1911–1925 Flinders Football Association; 1925–1946 Great Flinders Football Association
- Sport: Australian rules football
- Founded: 1911; 115 years ago
- First season: 1911
- No. of teams: 7
- Most recent champions: Lock (4th Premiership) (2026)
- Most titles: Ramblers (42 Premierships)
- Related competitions: Mortlock Shield, SANFL
- Website: https://www.greatflinders.com

The Great Flinders Football League (GFFL) is an Australian rules football competition based in the Eyre Peninsula region of South Australia, Australia. It is an affiliated member of the South Australian National Football League. The current Premiers are the Lock Football Club who defeated the United Yeelanna Football Club in the 2025 Grand Final at Cummins.

Elliston and Western Districts merged and transferred from the Mid West Football League prior to the start of the 2021 season. Near the end of the 2021 season the clubs of the Great Flinders Football League and Great Flinders Netball Association unanimously voted to include Elliston and Districts for the 2022 season and beyond.

== Brief history ==
The Great Flinders Football League began in 1911 as the Flinders Football Association with founding clubs including Cummins, Edillilie, Pilanna, Shannon, Stokes and Yallunda Flat.

== Clubs ==
=== Locations ===
Locations of the Great Flinders FL clubs

=== Current ===
| Club | Jumper | Moniker | Home Ground | Former League | Founded | Years in GFFL | GFFL Senior Premierships | |
| Club | Jumper | Moniker | Home Ground | Former League | Founded | Years in GFFL | Total | Years |
|---|---|---|---|---|---|---|---|---|
| Cummins Ramblers (Cockaleechie 1946-47) | | Magpies | Cummins Oval, Cummins | – | 1919 | 1919- | 42 | 1928, 1930, 1932, 1936, 1946, 1948, 1949, 1950, 1952, 1957, 1958, 1959, 1961, 1964, 1968, 1969, 1970, 1971, 1972, 1973, 1974, 1975, 1976, 1977, 1978, 1979, 1980, 1981, 1982, 1989, 1994 1998, 2002, 2003, 2004, 2005, 2006, 2008, 2010, 2011, 2013, 2017 |
| Cummins Kapinnie | | Cougars | Cummins Oval, Cummins and Kapinnie Oval, Kapinnie | – | 1997 | 1997- | 2 | 2000, 2001 |
| Elliston Districts | | Roosters | Elliston Oval, Elliston; Minnipa Oval, Minnipa and Poochera Oval, Poochera | – | 2021 | 2021- | 0 | - |
| Eyre United | | Saints | Ungarra Oval, Ungarra | PLFL | 1963 | 1971- | 0 | - |
| Lock | | Roos | Lock Oval, Lock | LHFL | 1915 | 1971- | 4 | 1996, 1997, 2025, 2026 |
| Tumby Bay | | Blues | Tumby Bay Oval, Tumby Bay | PLFL | 1906 | 1981- | 4 | 1995, 1999, 2007, 2009 |
| United Yeelanna | | Eagles | Karkoo Oval, Karkoo | – | 1964 | 1964- | 14 | 1967, 1983, 1986, 1987, 2012, 2014, 2015, 2016, 2018, 2019, 2021, 2022, 2023, 2024 |

=== Former ===
| Club | Jumper | Moniker | Home Ground | Former League | Founded | Years in GFFL | GFFL Senior Premierships | | Fate |
| Club | Jumper | Moniker | Home Ground | Former League | Founded | Years in GFFL | Total | Years | Fate |
|---|---|---|---|---|---|---|---|---|---|
| Brooker (Stokes/Brooker 1911-12) | | | Hundred of Brooker, Section 13 | – | 1908 | 1911-1915 | 0 | - | Only played challenge matches after World War I, folded in 1922 |
| Cockaleechie | | | Cockaleechie Oval, Cockaleechie | – | 1937 | 1937-1939 | 1 | 1946 | Although a separate club before WWII, became Cummins Ramblers in 1946. |
| Cummins (Centrals 1919-24, Rovers 1925-39, Cummins West 1940-46) | (1919-24)(1925-96) | Reds, Roosters | Cummins Oval, Cummins | – | 1909 | 1909-1940, 1946-1996 | 15 | 1912, 1914, 1920, 1926, 1929, 1933, 1934, 1935, 1937, 1938, 1939, 1947, 1951, 1962, 1963 | Split into Centrals and Ramblers in 1919. Merged with Kapinnie to form Cummins Kapinnie in 1997 |
| Cummins | | Stars | Cummins Oval, Cummins | – | 1922 | 1922 | 1 | 1922 | Entered in 1922 after league dispute with Shannon and folded when they re-entered. Consisted mainly of Shannon players. |
| Curtawilla | | | Cummins Oval, Cummins | – | 1940 | 1940 | 0 | - | Folded after 1940 season |
| Edillilie (1) | | | Edillie Oval, Edillilie | – | 1911 | 1911-1915 | 0 | | Folded due to World War I |
| Edillilie (2) | | | Edillie Oval, Edillilie | MRFA | 1931 | 1936-1939, 1946-1959, 1961-1964 | 3 | 1953, 1954, 1955 | Recess due to lack of players in 1960. Merged with Kapinnie in 1964 |
| Karkoo | (1931)(1938-39)(1952-57) | | Karkoo Oval, Karkoo | – | 1931 | 1931-1939, 1952-1957 | 0 | - | Merged with Yeelanna to form Shannon in 1946. Split from Shannon in 1951. Merged with United (Murdinga) from Central Areas FA to form United (Karkoo & Murdinga) in 1957 |
| Kapinnie | (1934-?)(1946-?)(?–1997) | Tigers | Kapinnie Oval, Kapinnie and Edillilie Oval, Edillilie | – | 1934 | 1934-1939, 1946-1997 | 10 | 1960, 1965, 1966, 1984, 1985, 1988, 1990, 1991, 1992, 1993 | Merged with Cummins to form Cummins Kapinnie in 1997 |
| Marble Range | | Rangers | Coulta Oval, Coulta and Wangary Oval, Wangary | PLFA | 1938 | 1948-1952 | 0 | - | Returned to Port Lincoln FL in 1953 |
| Mortlock | | | Hundredth of Mortlock | – | 1912 | 1912 | 0 | - | Folded due to lack of players |
| Mount Hope | | | "Speed's Paddock", Mount Hope | – | 1926 | 1926-1940 | 0 | - | Did not reform after World War II |
| Pillana | | | Cummins Oval, Cummins | – | 1908 | 1911 | 0 | - | Folded due to lack of players |
| Shannon | | Eagles | Karkoo Oval, Karkoo and Yeelanna Oval, Yeelanna | – | 1946 | 1946-1951 | 0 | - | Split up into Yeelanna and Karkoo after 1951 |
| United | | | Karkoo Oval, Karkoo and Murdinga Oval, Murdinga | – | 1957 | 1957-1963 | 0 | - | Merged with Yeelanna to form United Yeelanna in 1964 |
| Yallunda Flat | | | Yallunda Flat Oval, Yallunda Flat | WFA | 1906 | 1911 | 0 | - | Returned to Warratta FA in 1912 |
| Yeelanna (Shannon 1909-1926) | | Gold & Blues, Eagles | Yeelanna Oval, Yeelanna | – | 1909 | 1911-1915 1919-1921, 1923-1946, 1951-1963 | 12 | 1911, 1913, 1915, 1919, 1920, 1921, 1923, 1924, 1925, 1927, 1928, 1931, 1956 | Merged with Karkoo in 1946, to form Shannon. Split from Shannon in 1951. Merged with United to form United Yeelanna in 1964. |

== Premiers ==
- 1911 Shannon
- 1912 Cummins
- 1913 Shannon
- 1914 Cummins
- 1915 Shannon
- 1916–1918 Recess due to WW1
- 1919 Shannon
- 1920 Shannon
- 1921 Shannon
- 1922 Stars
- 1923 Shannon
- 1924 Shannon
- 1925 Shannon
- 1926 Ramblers
- 1927 Shannon
- 1928 Shannon
- 1929 Rovers
- 1930 Ramblers
- 1931 Yeelanna
- 1932 Ramblers
- 1933 Rovers
- 1934 Rovers
- 1935 Ramblers
- 1936 Ramblers
- 1937 Rovers
- 1938 Rovers
- 1939 Rovers
- 1940 Season suspended without premier named
- 1941-1945 Recess due to WW2
- 1946 Cockaleechie
- 1947 Cummins
- 1948 Ramblers
- 1949 Ramblers
- 1950 Ramblers
- 1951 Cummins
- 1952 Ramblers
- 1953 Edillilie
- 1954 Edillilie
- 1955 Edillilie
- 1956 Shannon
- 1957 Ramblers
- 1958 Ramblers
- 1959 Ramblers
- 1960 Kapinnie
- 1961 Ramblers
- 1962 Cummins
- 1963 Cummins
- 1964 Ramblers
- 1965 Kapinnie
- 1966 Kapinnie
- 1967 United Yeelanna
- 1968 Ramblers
- 1969 Ramblers
- 1970 Ramblers
- 1971 Ramblers
- 1972 Ramblers
- 1973 Ramblers
- 1974 Ramblers
- 1975 Ramblers
- 1976 Ramblers
- 1977 Ramblers
- 1978 Ramblers
- 1979 Ramblers
- 1980 Ramblers
- 1981 Ramblers
- 1982 Ramblers
- 1983 United Yeelanna
- 1984 Kapinnie
- 1985 Kapinnie
- 1986 United Yeelanna
- 1987 United Yeelanna
- 1988 Kapinnie
- 1989 Ramblers
- 1990 Kapinnie
- 1991 Kapinnie
- 1992 Kapinnie
- 1993 Kapinnie
- 1994 Ramblers
- 1995 Tumby Bay
- 1996 Lock
- 1997 Lock
- 1998 Ramblers
- 1999 Tumby Bay
- 2000 Cummins Kapinnie
- 2001 Cummins Kapinnie
- 2002 Ramblers
- 2003 Ramblers
- 2004 Ramblers
- 2005 Ramblers
- 2006 Ramblers
- 2007 Tumby Bay
- 2008 Ramblers
- 2009 Tumby Bay
- 2010 Ramblers
- 2011 Ramblers
- 2012 United Yeelanna
- 2013 Ramblers
- 2014 United Yeelanna
- 2015 United Yeelanna
- 2016 United Yeelanna
- 2017 Ramblers
- 2018 United Yeelanna
- 2019 United Yeelanna
- 2020 Recess due to COVID-19
- 2021 United Yeelanna
- 2022 United Yeelanna
- 2023 United Yeelanna
- 2024 United Yeelanna
- 2025 Lock
- 2026 Lock

== 2014 Ladder ==
| Great Flinders | Wins | Byes | Losses | Draws | For | Against | % | Pts | Final | Team | G | B | Pts | Team | G | B | Pts |
|---|---|---|---|---|---|---|---|---|---|---|---|---|---|---|---|---|---|
| United Yeelanna | 14 | 0 | 1 | 0 | 2003 | 679 | 74.68 | 28 | 1st Semi | Ramblers | 15 | 15 | 105 | Cummins Kapinnie | 6 | 6 | 42 |
| Eyre United | 9 | 0 | 5 | 1 | 1259 | 1229 | 50.60 | 19 | 2nd Semi | United Yeelanna | 35 | 9 | 219 | Eyre United | 9 | 8 | 62 |
| Ramblers | 9 | 0 | 6 | 0 | 1355 | 1117 | 54.81 | 18 | Preliminary | Eyre United | 9 | 10 | 64 | Ramblers | 18 | 10 | 118 |
| Cummins Kapinnie | 6 | 0 | 9 | 0 | 982 | 1477 | 39.93 | 12 | Grand | United Yeelanna | 19 | 4 | 118 | Ramblers | 11 | 5 | 71 |
| Tumby Bay | 5 | 0 | 10 | 0 | 1086 | 1195 | 47.61 | 10 | | | | | | | | | |
| Lock | 1 | 0 | 13 | 1 | 756 | 1744 | 30.24 | 3 | | | | | | | | | |

== 2015 Ladder ==
| Great Flinders | Wins | Byes | Losses | Draws | For | Against | % | Pts | Final | Team | G | B | Pts | Team | G | B | Pts |
|---|---|---|---|---|---|---|---|---|---|---|---|---|---|---|---|---|---|
| United Yeelanna | 14 | 0 | 1 | 0 | 1804 | 900 | 66.72 | 28 | 1st Semi | Ramblers | 10 | 7 | 67 | Tumby Bay | 4 | 7 | 31 |
| Lock | 11 | 0 | 4 | 0 | 1656 | 879 | 65.33 | 22 | 2nd Semi | United Yeelanna | 17 | 7 | 109 | Lock | 10 | 7 | 67 |
| Ramblers | 8 | 0 | 7 | 0 | 1099 | 996 | 52.46 | 16 | Preliminary | Lock | 18 | 11 | 119 | Ramblers | 17 | 7 | 109 |
| Tumby Bay | 7 | 0 | 8 | 0 | 1175 | 1044 | 52.95 | 14 | Grand | United Yeelanna | 19 | 10 | 124 | Lock | 23 | 10 | 84 |
| Cummins Kapinnie | 5 | 0 | 10 | 0 | 923 | 1540 | 37.47 | 10 | | | | | | | | | |
| Eyre United | 0 | 0 | 15 | 0 | 570 | 1868 | 23.38 | 0 | | | | | | | | | |

== 2016 Ladder ==
| Great Flinders | Wins | Byes | Losses | Draws | For | Against | % | Pts | Final | Team | G | B | Pts | Team | G | B | Pts |
|---|---|---|---|---|---|---|---|---|---|---|---|---|---|---|---|---|---|
| United Yeelanna | 14 | 0 | 1 | 0 | 1468 | 760 | 65.89 | 28 | 1st Semi | Tumby Bay | 8 | 6 | 54 | Cummins Kapinnie | 10 | 12 | 72 |
| Ramblers | 11 | 0 | 4 | 0 | 1192 | 789 | 60.17 | 22 | 2nd Semi | United Yeelanna | 13 | 12 | 90 | Ramblers | 10 | 7 | 67 |
| Tumby Bay | 9 | 0 | 6 | 0 | 1144 | 929 | 55.19 | 18 | Preliminary | Ramblers | 12 | 10 | 82 | Cummins Kapinnie | 14 | 11 | 95 |
| Cummins Kapinnie | 6 | 0 | 9 | 0 | 1123 | 1015 | 52.53 | 12 | Grand | United Yeelanna | 18 | 11 | 119 | Cummins Kapinnie | 9 | 11 | 65 |
| Eyre United | 5 | 0 | 10 | 0 | 1030 | 1188 | 46.44 | 10 | | | | | | | | | |
| Lock | 0 | 0 | 15 | 0 | 435 | 1711 | 20.27 | 0 | | | | | | | | | |

== 2017 Ladder ==
| Great Flinders | Wins | Byes | Losses | Draws | For | Against | % | Pts | Final | Team | G | B | Pts | Team | G | B | Pts |
|---|---|---|---|---|---|---|---|---|---|---|---|---|---|---|---|---|---|
| United Yeelanna | 15 | 0 | 0 | 0 | 1863 | 744 | 71.46 | 30 | 1st Semi | Eyre United | 10 | 9 | 69 | Tumby Bay | 7 | 10 | 52 |
| Ramblers | 8 | 0 | 7 | 0 | 1119 | 933 | 54.53 | 16 | 2nd Semi | United Yeelanna | 15 | 14 | 104 | Ramblers | 6 | 9 | 45 |
| Eyre United | 8 | 0 | 7 | 0 | 1333 | 1255 | 51.51 | 16 | Preliminary | Ramblers | 15 | 15 | 105 | Eyre United | 7 | 8 | 50 |
| Tumby Bay | 6 | 0 | 9 | 0 | 1023 | 1086 | 48.51 | 12 | Grand | United Yeelanna | 10 | 11 | 71 | Ramblers | 15 | 10 | 100 |
| Cummins Kapinnie | 6 | 0 | 9 | 0 | 888 | 1224 | 42.05 | 12 | | | | | | | | | |
| Lock | 2 | 0 | 13 | 0 | 683 | 1667 | 29.06 | 4 | | | | | | | | | |

== 2018 Ladder ==
| Great Flinders | Wins | Byes | Losses | Draws | For | Against | % | Pts | Final | Team | G | B | Pts | Team | G | B | Pts |
|---|---|---|---|---|---|---|---|---|---|---|---|---|---|---|---|---|---|
| United Yeelanna | 15 | 0 | 0 | 0 | 1885 | 598 | 75.82 | 30 | 1st Semi | Ramblers | 16 | 12 | 108 | Cummins Kapinnie | 9 | 6 | 60 |
| Tumby Bay | 10 | 0 | 5 | 0 | 1134 | 956 | 54.26 | 20 | 2nd Semi | United Yeelanna | 14 | 11 | 95 | Tumby Bay | 11 | 8 | 74 |
| Ramblers | 8 | 0 | 7 | 0 | 1037 | 950 | 52.19 | 16 | Preliminary | Tumby Bay | 11 | 9 | 75 | Ramblers | 3 | 4 | 22 |
| Cummins Kapinnie | 5 | 0 | 10 | 0 | 951 | 1268 | 42.86 | 10 | Grand | United Yeelanna | 16 | 13 | 109 | Tumby Bay | 3 | 4 | 22 |
| Eyre United | 4 | 0 | 11 | 0 | 851 | 1594 | 34.81 | 8 | | | | | | | | | |
| Lock | 3 | 0 | 12 | 0 | 772 | 1264 | 37.82 | 6 | | | | | | | | | |

== 2019 Ladder ==
| Great Flinders | Wins | Byes | Losses | Draws | For | Against | % | Pts | Final | Team | G | B | Pts | Team | G | B | Pts |
|---|---|---|---|---|---|---|---|---|---|---|---|---|---|---|---|---|---|
| United Yeelanna | 15 | 0 | 0 | 0 | 2028 | 517 | 79.69 | 30 | 1st Semi | Ramblers | 7 | 4 | 46 | Cummins Kapinnie | 5 | 9 | 39 |
| Tumby Bay | 10 | 0 | 5 | 0 | 1058 | 819 | 56.37 | 20 | 2nd Semi | United Yeelanna | 20 | 20 | 140 | Tumby Bay | 7 | 5 | 47 |
| Ramblers | 9 | 0 | 6 | 0 | 1161 | 718 | 61.79 | 18 | Preliminary | Tumby Bay | 4 | 3 | 27 | Ramblers | 9 | 15 | 69 |
| Cummins Kapinnie | 8 | 0 | 7 | 0 | 1061 | 1006 | 51.33 | 16 | Grand | United Yeelanna | 16 | 11 | 107 | Ramblers | 7 | 3 | 45 |
| Lock | 3 | 0 | 12 | 0 | 632 | 1403 | 31.06 | 6 | | | | | | | | | |
| Eyre United | 0 | 0 | 15 | 0 | 419 | 1896 | 18.10 | 0 | | | | | | | | | |

== 2021 Ladder ==
| Great Flinders | Wins | Byes | Losses | Draws | For | Against | % | Pts | Final | Team | G | B | Pts | Team | G | B | Pts |
|---|---|---|---|---|---|---|---|---|---|---|---|---|---|---|---|---|---|
| Cummins Kapinnie | 12 | 3 | 0 | 0 | 1266 | 484 | 72.34 | 24 | 1st Semi | Ramblers | 8 | 4 | 52 | Lock | 8 | 9 | 57 |
| United Yeelanna | 9 | 3 | 3 | 0 | 1193 | 667 | 64.14 | 18 | 2nd Semi | Cummins Kapinnie | 10 | 12 | 72 | United Yeelanna | 9 | 12 | 66 |
| Ramblers | 7 | 3 | 5 | 0 | 718 | 680 | 51.36 | 14 | Preliminary | United Yeelanna | 12 | 7 | 79 | Lock | 5 | 7 | 37 |
| Lock | 6 | 3 | 6 | 0 | 972 | 779 | 55.51 | 12 | Grand | Cummins Kapinnie | 6 | 7 | 43 | United Yeelanna | 6 | 10 | 46 |
| Elliston Districts | 5 | 3 | 7 | 0 | 691 | 947 | 42.19 | 10 | | | | | | | | | |
| Tumby Bay | 3 | 3 | 9 | 0 | 633 | 913 | 40.94 | 6 | | | | | | | | | |
| Eyre United | 0 | 3 | 12 | 0 | 389 | 1392 | 21.84 | 0 | | | | | | | | | |

== 2022 Ladder ==
| Great Flinders | Wins | Losses | Draws | Byes | For | Against | % | Pts | Final | Team | G | B | Pts | Team | G | B | Pts |
|---|---|---|---|---|---|---|---|---|---|---|---|---|---|---|---|---|---|
| United Yeelanna | 14 | 0 | 0 | 3 | 1282 | 541 | 70.32 | 28 | 1st Semi | Tumby Bay | 8 | 11 | 59 | Lock | 9 | 9 | 63 |
| Elliston Districts | 10 | 4 | 0 | 3 | 1241 | 621 | 66.65 | 20 | 2nd Semi | United Yeelanna | 11 | 8 | 74 | Elliston Districts | 7 | 14 | 56 |
| Tumby Bay | 8 | 6 | 0 | 3 | 994 | 790 | 55.72 | 16 | Preliminary | Elliston Districts | 12 | 12 | 84 | Lock | 7 | 4 | 46 |
| Lock | 7 | 7 | 0 | 3 | 952 | 849 | 52.86 | 14 | Grand | United Yeelanna | 15 | 5 | 95 | Elliston Districts | 3 | 7 | 25 |
| Ramblers | 6 | 8 | 0 | 3 | 900 | 919 | 49.48 | 12 | | | | | | | | | |
| Cummins/Kapinnie Cougars | 4 | 10 | 0 | 3 | 687 | 952 | 41.92 | 8 | | | | | | | | | |
| Eyre United | 0 | 14 | 0 | 3 | 386 | 1770 | 17.90 | 0 | | | | | | | | | |

== 2023 Ladder ==
| Great Flinders | Wins | Losses | Draws | Byes | For | Against | % | Pts | Final | Team | G | B | Pts | Team | G | B | Pts |
|---|---|---|---|---|---|---|---|---|---|---|---|---|---|---|---|---|---|
| United Yeelanna | 14 | 0 | 0 | 3 | 1730 | 510 | 77.23 | 28 | 1st Semi | Lock | 7 | 13 | 55 | Ramblers | 8 | 3 | 51 |
| Tumby Bay | 11 | 3 | 0 | 3 | 1234 | 544 | 69.40 | 22 | 2nd Semi | United Yeelanna | 15 | 9 | 99 | Tumby Bay | 3 | 3 | 21 |
| Lock | 9 | 5 | 0 | 3 | 1194 | 619 | 65.85 | 18 | Preliminary | Tumby Bay | 10 | 11 | 71 | Lock | 9 | 11 | 65 |
| Ramblers | 8 | 6 | 0 | 3 | 907 | 846 | 51.73 | 16 | Grand | United Yeelanna | 15 | 15 | 105 | Tumby Bay | 11 | 7 | 73 |
| Eliston Districts | 5 | 9 | 0 | 3 | 823 | 1027 | 44.48 | 10 | | | | | | | | | |
| Cummins/Kapinnie Cougars | 1 | 13 | 0 | 3 | 464 | 1326 | 25.92 | 2 | | | | | | | | | |
| Eyre United | 1 | 13 | 0 | 3 | 462 | 1942 | 19.21 | 2 | | | | | | | | | |

== 2024 Ladder ==
| Great Flinders | Wins | Losses | Draws | Byes | For | Against | % | Pts | Final | Team | G | B | Pts | Team | G | B | Pts |
|---|---|---|---|---|---|---|---|---|---|---|---|---|---|---|---|---|---|
| Lock | 13 | 1 | 0 | 3 | 1777 | 568 | 75.77 | 26 | 1st Semi | Ramblers | 12 | 11 | 83 | Tumby Bay | 13 | 4 | 82 |
| United Yeelanna | 13 | 1 | 0 | 3 | 1485 | 608 | 70.95 | 26 | 2nd Semi | Lock | 10 | 8 | 68 | United Yeelanna | 11 | 9 | 75 |
| Ramblers | 8 | 6 | 0 | 3 | 1011 | 1065 | 48.69 | 16 | Preliminary | Lock | 14 | 12 | 96 | Ramblers | 1 | 8 | 14 |
| Tumby Bay | 7 | 7 | 0 | 3 | 1016 | 1074 | 48.61 | 14 | Grand | United Yeelanna | 10 | 11 | 71 | Lock | 4 | 10 | 34 |
| Elliston Districts | 4 | 10 | 0 | 3 | 807 | 1225 | 39.71 | 8 | | | | | | | | | |
| Cummins/Kapinnie Cougars | 3 | 11 | 0 | 3 | 628 | 1250 | 33.43 | 6 | | | | | | | | | |
| Eyre United | 1 | 13 | 0 | 3 | 672 | 1606 | 29.49 | 2 | | | | | | | | | |

== Books ==
- Encyclopedia of South Australian country football clubs / compiled by Peter Lines. ISBN 9780980447293
- South Australian country football digest / by Peter Lines ISBN 9780987159199
