= Mortlock Shield =

Australian rules football competition

Mortlock Shield Championship
- Most recent season or competition: 2024
- Sport: Australian rules football
- Founded: 1936
- First season: 27 June 1936; 90 years ago
- Divisions: Mortlock Shield - Senior Men Norwood Cup - Under 15 Mixed
- No. of teams: 5
- Most recent champions: Lincoln City (8th Championship) (2024)
- Most titles: Great Flinders (27 Championships)
- Sponsors: Bendigo Bank; Norwood Football Club; City of Port Lincoln
- Related competitions: Eastern Eyre Football League, Great Flinders Football League, Port Lincoln Football League, Western Eyre Football League, South Australian Country Football Championships, SANFL
- Website: www.mortlockshield.com.au

The Mortlock Shield Championship, known for commercial reasons as the Port Lincoln Bendigo Bank Mortlock Shield Championship and commonly known as just the Mortlock Shield is an annual Australian rules football competition based in Port Lincoln, South Australia. The competition tis held annually at Centenary Oval and it consists of a round robin lightning football tournament with representative teams of leagues from the Eyre Peninsula and beyond. It is an affiliated competition of the South Australian National Football League (SANFL). The current champions are Western Eyre who won the 2025 edition of the carnival.

== Brief history ==
Named after William Tennant Mortlock, the Mortlock Shield began in 1936 when the football associations of Central Eyre, Cleve, Eastern Eyre, Great Flinders and Port Lincoln decided to hold a football tournament to celebrate the centenary of South Australia. Since 1994 The best players from the carnival are selected represent the Eyre Peninsula team in the SA Country Football Championship.

== Format ==
The current format of the Mortlock Shield consists of a single round robin structure composed of 5 representative sides of football leagues from around the Eyre Peninsula. The carnival is held over two days on the Kings Birthday long weekend (Saturday and Monday). The games are played under lightning football conditions with two twenty minute halves. The team on top of the ladder after four games played is declared champion and awarded the perpetual Mortlock Shield to commemorate their win.

Until 2021 teams formally played two full games (one on Saturday and one on Monday) against two select opponents and the team who finished top of the ladder was declared champion

== List of Champions ==
List of Mortlock Shield Champions.

- 1936 Great Flinders
- 1939 Eastern Eyre (Original)
- 1947 Port Lincoln 1
- 1949 Le Hunte
- 1951 Great Flinders
- 1953 Port Lincoln
- 1955 Great Flinders
- 1956 Great Flinders
- 1957 Great Flinders
- 1958 Eastern Eyre (Original)
- 1959 Great Flinders
- 1960 Far West
- 1961 Port Lincoln
- 1962 Port Lincoln
- 1963 County Jervois
- 1964 Lincoln City
- 1965 Lincoln City
- 1966 County Jervois
- 1967 Lincoln City
- 1968 Lincoln Districts
- 1969 Far West
- 1970 Lincoln City
- 1971 Lincoln Districts
- 1972 Great Flinders
- 1973 Le Hunte
- 1974 Great Flinders
- 1975 Great Flinders
- 1976 Great Flinders
- 1977 Lincoln Districts
- 1978 Great Flinders
- 1979 Lincoln Districts
- 1980 Great Flinders
- 1981 Lincoln Districts
- 1982 Great Flinders
- 1983 Far West
- 1984 Far West
- 1985 Lincoln Districts
- 1986 Far West
- 1987 Lincoln Districts
- 1988 Far West
- 1989 Eastern Eyre
- 1990 Far West
- 1991 Eastern Eyre
- 1992 Great Flinders
- 1993 Great Flinders
- 1994 Lincoln Districts
- 1995 Eastern Eyre
- 1996 Great Flinders
- 1997 Mid West
- 1998 Great Flinders
- 1999 Lincoln Districts
- 2000 Mid West
- 2001 Great Flinders
- 2002 Great Flinders
- 2003 Mid West
- 2004 Lincoln City
- 2005 Mid West
- 2006 Great Flinders
- 2007 Great Flinders
- 2008 Great Flinders
- 2009 Port Lincoln
- 2010 Port Lincoln
- 2011 Port Lincoln
- 2012 Lincoln City
- 2013 Great Flinders
- 2014 Great Flinders
- 2015 EP Sharks
- 2016 Eastern Eyre
- 2017 Lincoln City
- 2018 EP Sharks
- 2019 Great Flinders
- 2020 COVID-19
- 2021 Great Flinders
- 2022 Great Flinders
- 2023 Western Eyre
- 2024 Lincoln City
- 2025 Western Eyre

== Current Teams ==
Team	Colours	Representative	Years in comp	Shields	Championship years
Eastern Eyre		Eastern Eyre Football League	1989-	4	1989, 1991, 1995, 2016
Great Flinders		Great Flinders Football League	1936-	27	1936, 1951, 1955. 1956, 1957, 1959, 1972, 1974, 1975, 1976, 1978, 1980, 1982, 1992, 1993, 1996, 1998, 2001, 2002, 2006, 2007, 2008, 2013, 2014, 2019, 2021, 2022
Lincoln City		Port Lincoln Football League (Lincoln South, Tasman and Wayback players)	1964–2006, 2012-	8	1964, 1965, 1967, 1970, 2004, 2012, 2017, 2024
Lincoln Districts		Port Lincoln Football League (Boston, Mallee Park and Marble Range players)	1964–2006, 2012-	9	1968, 1971, 1977, 1979, 1981, 1985, 1987, 1994, 1999
Western Eyre (Formerly Far West)		Western Eyre Football League	1957-	8	1960, 1969, 1983, 1984, 1986, 1988, 1990, 2023, 2025

== 2017 Ladder ==
Pos	Team	Played	Wins	Losses	For	Against	%	Pts
1	Lincoln City	2	2	0	130	92	58.56	4
2	Great Flinders	2	2	0	110	84	56.70	4
3	EP Sharks	2	1	1	116	79	59.49	2
4	Far West	2	1	1	119	89	57.21	2
5	Eastern Eyre	2	1	1	123	108	53.25	2
6	Lincoln Districts	2	1	1	102	117	46.58	2
7	Mid West	2	0	2	98	136	41.88	0
8	Far North	2	0	2	58	151	27.75	0

== 2018 Ladder ==
Pos	Team	Played	Wins	Losses	For	Against	%	Pts
1	EP Sharks	2	2	0	172	76	69.35	4
2	Great Flinders	2	2	0	93	56	62.42	4
3	Mid West	2	1	1	126	64	66.32	2
4	Lincoln City	2	1	1	90	99	47.62	2
5	Eastern Eyre	2	1	1	81	99	45.00	2
6	Far West	2	1	1	96	144	40.00	2
7	Lincoln Districts	2	0	2	105	115	47.43	0
8	Far North	2	0	2	36	146	19.78	0

== 2019 Ladder ==
Pos	Team	Played	Wins	Losses	For	Against	%	Pts
1	Great Flinders	2	2	0	122	81	60.10	4
2	Lincoln Districts	2	2	0	125	95	56.82	4
3	Lincoln City	2	1	1	105	103	50.48	2
4	Eastern Eyre	2	1	1	86	90	48.86	2
5	Mid West	2	0	2	84	103	44.92	0
6	Far West	2	0	2	82	132	38.32	0

== 2021 Ladder ==
Pos	Team	Played	Wins	Losses	For	Against	%	Pts
1	Great Flinders	4	3	1	187	119	61.11	6
2	Lincoln City	4	3	1	140	147	48.78	6
3	Eastern Eyre	4	2	2	131	163	44.56	4
4	Lincoln Districts	4	1	3	166	166	47.80	2
5	Western Eyre	4	1	3	124	139	47.15	2

== 2022 ladder ==
Pos	Team	Played	Wins	Losses	For	Against	%	Pts	Final	Team	G	B	Pts	Team	G	B	Pts
1	Great Flinders	4	4	0	161	90	64.14	8	Grand Final	Great Flinders	6	5	41	Eastern Eyre	3	5	33
2	Eastern Eyre	4	3	1	110	84	62.94	6									
3	Lincoln Districts	4	2	2	146	111	56.81	4									
4	Western Eyre	4	1	3	128	161	44.29	2									
5	Lincoln City	4	0	4	82	200	29.08	0									

== 2023 Ladder ==
Pos	Team	Played	Wins	Losses	For	Against	%	Pts
1	Western Eyre	4	3	1	161	84	65.71	6
2	Lincoln Districts	4	3	1	175	127	57.95	6
3	Great Flinders	4	2	2	147	117	55.68	4
4	Lincoln City	4	1	3	89	143	38.36	2
5	Eastern Eyre	4	1	3	78	179	30.35	2

== Norwood Cup ==
The Norwood Cup, formally North Adelaide Shield and Port Adelaide Cup is an Under-15's mixed Competition ran on the Saturday between the Mortlock Shield. The cup is sponsored by the Norwood Football Club who compete in the SANFL as the Eyre Peninsula falls under their country zone which is in place to develop youth football to professional level in South Australia.
