= South Australian Country Football Championships =

Annual Australian rules football competition

The South Australian Country Football Championships is an annual Australian rules football competition run by the South Australian National Football League, played between representative teams from the six country football zones.

== Current Zones ==
The competing zones, which differ from the zones defined in the constitution of the South Australian Community Football League, consist of the following:

| Zone | Colours | Leagues | Championships | | | |
| Zone | Colours | Leagues | Men | | Women | |
| Zone | Colours | Leagues | Total | Years | Total | Years |
|---|---|---|---|---|---|---|
| Central Zone | | Adelaide Plains Football League; Barossa Light & Gawler Football Association; Yorke Peninsula Football League | 3 | 2006, 2013, 2019 | 1 | 2023 |
| Eastern Zone | | Hills Football League; Murray Valley Football League; Riverland Football League; River Murray Football League | 4 | 1998, 2008, 2023, 2024 | 2 | 2018, 2024 |
| Eyre Peninsula (Western) | | Eastern Eyre Football League; Great Flinders Football League; Port Lincoln Football League; Western Eyre Football League | 5 | 1994, 1997, 1999, 2011, 2018 | 0 | - |
| Northern | | Broken Hill Football League; Far North Football League; Northern Areas Football Association; North Eastern Football League; Spencer Gulf Football League; Whyalla Football League | 0 | - | 1 | 2021 |
| South East | | Kowree-Naracoorte-Tatiara Football League; Limestone Coast Football League; Mid South Eastern Football League | 5 | 2014, 2016, 2017, 2022, 2025 | 0 | - |
| Southern Districts | | Great Southern Football League; Kangaroo Island Football League; Southern Football League | 11 | 1995, 1996, 2003, 2004, 2005, 2007, 2009, 2010, 2012, 2015, 2021 | 2 | 2019, 2022 |

== Competition Results ==
=== Men ===
| Year | Location | Champions | Runner-up | 3rd | 4th | 5th | Last | Ref. |
|---|---|---|---|---|---|---|---|---|
| 1994 | Football Park, Adelaide | Eyre Peninsula | South East | | | | | |
| 1995 | Adelaide | Southern Districts | South East | | | | | |
| 1996 | Adelaide | Southern Districts | Broken Hill / Murray Mallee | | | | | |
| 1997 | Adelaide | Eyre Peninsula | Southern Districts | | | | | |
| 1998 | Adelaide | Murray Mallee | Southern Districts | | | | | |
| 1999 | | Eyre Peninusula | | | | | | |
| 2003 | | Southern Districts | South East | | | | | |
| 2004 | | Southern Districts | | | | | | |
| 2005 | | Southern Districts | | | | | | |
| 2006 | | Central | Southern Districts | Eyre Peninsula | Murray Mallee Barrier | South East | Northern Cities | |
| 2007 | Port Pirie | Southern Districts | Central | | | | | |
| 2008 | | Murray Mallee Barrier Barossa | Central | South East | Southern Districts | Eyre Peninsula | Northern | |
| 2009 | Berri Oval, Berri | Southern Districts | Eastern | Murray South East | Northern | Eyre Peninsula | Central | |
| 2010 | Berri Oval, Berri | Southern Districts | Eastern | Central | Murray South East | Eyre Peninsula | Northern | |
| 2011 | Memorial Oval, Port Pirie | Western | Murray South East | Southern Districts | Eastern | Northern | Central | |
| 2012 | Berri Oval, Berri | Southern Districts | Murray South East | Central | Northern | Eastern | Eyre Peninsula | |
| 2013 | Memorial Oval, Port Pirie | Central | Murray South East | Eyre Peninsula | Southern Districts | Eastern | Northern | |
| 2014 | Kadina Oval, Kadina | Murray South East | Eastern | Eyre Peninsula | Northern | Central | Southern Districts | |
| 2015 | Central Oval, Port Augusta | Southern Districts | Murray South East | Western | Eastern | Central | Northern | |
| 2016 | Centenary Oval, Port Lincoln | Murray South East | Southern Districts | Western | Northern | Central | Eastern | |
| 2017 | Johnstone Park, Murray Bridge | Murray South East | Southern Districts | Western | Eastern | Central | Northern | |
| 2018 | Renmark Oval, Renmark | Western | Central | Murray South East | Southern Districts | Northern | Eastern | |
| 2019 | Memorial Oval, Port Pirie | Central | Northern | Eyre Peninsula | Southern Districts | Murray South East | Eastern | |
| 2020 | No competition due to COVID-19 pandemic | | | | | | | |
| 2021 | Victor Harbor Oval, Victor Harbor and Encounter Bay Recreation Reserve, Encounter Bay | Southern Districts | Central | Eyre Peninsula | Northern | Murray South East | Eastern | |
| 2022 | Bennett Oval and Memorial Oval, Whyalla | South East | Central | Eyre Peninsula | Middle atlantic | Northern | Southern Districts | |
| 2023 | Angas Recreation Park, Angaston and Centennial Oval, Nuriootpa | Eastern | Central | Southern Districts | South East | Eyre Peninsula | Northern | |
| 2024 | Victor Harbor Oval, Victor Harbor and Encounter Bay Recreation Reserve, Encounter Bay | Eastern | Central | Eyre Peninsula | Southern Districts | South East | Northern | |
| 2025 | Memorial Oval, Port Pirie | South East | Southern Districts | Eyre Peninsula | Eastern | Central | Northern | |

=== Women ===
| Year | Location | Champions | Runner-up | 3rd | 4th | 5th | Last | Ref. |
|---|---|---|---|---|---|---|---|---|
| 2018 | Renmark Oval, Renmark | Eastern | Southern Districts | Northern | South East | Central | 5 teams (2018) | |
| 2019 | Memorial Oval, Port Pirie | Southern Districts | Northern | Central | Murray South East | Eyre Peninsula | Eastern | |
| 2020 | No competition due to COVID-19 pandemic | | | | | | | |
| 2021 | Victor Harbor Oval, Victor Harbor and Encounter Bay Recreation Reserve, Encounter Bay | Northern | Murray South East | Southern Districts | Eyre Peninsula | Central | Eastern | |
| 2022 | Whyalla Secondary College, Bennett Oval and Memorial Oval, Whyalla | Southern Districts | South East | Central | Northern | Eastern | Eyre Peninsula | |
| 2023 | Angas Recreation Park, Angaston and Centennial Oval, Nuriootpa | Central | Eastern | Southern Districts | South East | Eyre Peninsula | Northern | |
| 2024 | Victor Harbor Oval, Victor Harbor and Encounter Bay Recreation Reserve, Encounter Bay | Eastern | Central | Eyre Peninsula | South East | Southern Districts | Northern | |
| 2025 | Memorial Oval, Port Pirie | Eastern | South East | Eyre Peninsula | Central | Southern Districts | Northern | |

== Don McSweeny Medal ==
The Don McSweeny Medal is presented to the best player of the carnival, judged by the allocation of votes by the umpires of each game using the 3-2-1 method. The medal is named after South Australian Football Hall of Famer Don McSweeny OAM.

| Name | Medallist |
|---|---|
| 2004 | Matt Joraslafsky (Southern) |
| 2005 | Justin Henscke (Southern) |
| 2006 | Adam Merrett (South East) |
| 2007 | Damien Stevens (Murray Mallee Barrier Barossa) |
| 2008 | Todd Miles (Central) |
| 2009 | Mitchell Portlock (Southern) |
| 2010 | Ben Yeomans (Central) & Josh Vick (Southern) |
| 2011 | Matthew Woolford (Northern) |
| 2012 | Tyson Wait (Murray South East) |
| 2013 | Michael Liebelt (Central) |
| 2014 | Liam O'Neil (Murray South East) & Ben McIntyre (Murray South East) |
| 2015 | Xavier Watson (Eyre Peninsula) & Jack Kenny (Eyre Peninsula) |
| 2016 | Brian Fenton (Murray South East) |
| 2017 | Jack Kelly (Murray South East) |
| 2018 | |
| 2019 | Leigh Ryswyk (Central) |
| 2020 | No competition due to COVID-19 pandemic |
| 2021 | Jordan Fuller (Northern) |
| 2022 | Matt Willson (South East) |
| 2023 | Samuel Callins (Eastern) |
| 2024 | Joel Parker-Boers (Eastern) |

== Bill Murdoch Medal ==
A Medal is presented to the Coach of the Championships. Since 2013, the medal has been named the Bill Murdoch Medal

| Year | Medallist |
|---|---|
| 2007 | Tony Fielke (Southern Districts) |
| 2010 | Simon Dennis (Southern Districts) |
| 2011 | Symon Chase (Western) |
| 2012 | Steve Hill (Southern) |
| 2013 | Andrew Michael (Central) |
| 2014 | Luke Duncan (Murray South East) |
| 2015 | Barry Pilmore (Southern Districts) |
| 2016 | Adam Merrett (Murray South East) |
| 2017 | Adam Merrett (Murray South East) |
| 2018 | |
| 2019 | Steve Lubcke (Central) |
| 2020 | No competition due to COVID-19 pandemic |
| 2021 | Scott Wendelborn (Southern Districts) |
| 2022 | Jack Kelly (South East) |
| 2023 | Adam Klun (Eastern) |
| 2024 | Adam Klun (Eastern) |
