= Mortlock =

Mortlock is a surname. Notable people with the surname include:

- John Mortlock (1755–1816), British banker and politician
- Stirling Mortlock (born 1977), Australian rugby player
- Bryce Mortlock (1921–2004), Australian architect
- David Favis-Mortlock (born 1953), English geomorphologist and musician
- The Mortlock family of Martindale Hall included
  - William Ranson Mortlock (1821–1884), South Australian grazier and politician (father)
  - William Tennant Mortlock (1858–1913), South Australian grazier and politician (son)

== See also ==
- Mortlock Flying Fox, a species of flying fox
- Mortlock Football League, an Australian rules football league in Western Australia
- Mortlock Islands (disambiguation)
- Mortlock Library of Australiana, in the Mortlock wing of the State Library of South Australia
- Mortlock Shield, football competition in South Australia
