= Mitchell, South Australia =

Mitchell South Australia
- Coordinates: 34.0°S 135.6°E
- Postcode(s): 5632 (5607 before 2012)
- LGA(s): District Council of Lower Eyre Peninsula
- Region: Eyre Western
- County: Musgrave
- State electorate(s): Flinders
- Federal division(s): Grey
Localities around Mitchell:
Sheringa		Tooligie
Kiana	Mitchell	Karkoo
Mount Hope	Kapinnie	Yeelanna

Mitchell is a locality on Eyre Peninsula in South Australia. Its boundaries were set to roughly the northern two thirds of the Hundred of Mitchell, from which it draws its name, in 2003. Mitchell includes the former locality of Lake Brimpton, adjacent to a lake by the same name. The Lake Brimpton school opened in 1932 but has now closed.

The Hundred of Mitchell was named by Governor of South Australia, George Le Hunte after Samuel James Mitchell MP in 1903.
