= EEFL =

EEFL may refer to:

- Eastern Eyre Football League, an Australian rules football competition based in the Eyre Peninsula region of South Australia
- External Electrode Fluorescent Lamp, a plasma lamp coated with phosphor, which has no electrodes inside the lamp
- Eighth Edition For Life, a movement by players of Warhammer Fantasy to continue playing the eighth edition rules set
