= Mid West Football League =

Australian rules football competition

The Mid West Football League was an Australian rules football competition based in the Eyre Peninsula region of South Australia, Australia. It was wound up prior to the 2021 season after Wudinna and Central Eyre merged and transferred to the Eastern Eyre Football League.

== Brief history ==
The Mid West Football League was situated on the Eyre Peninsula in South Australia and fielded six teams in its final season in 2019 (the 2020 season was cancelled due to COVID-19). The MWFL formed by the merger of the Le Hunte Football League and the Streaky Bay Football League in 1988.

Eight clubs nominated for the inaugural season in 1988, with United FC and Wudinna FC amalgamating for the 1989 season. Foundation clubs Streaky Bay and Rovers amalgamated in the 1999 season leaving the current six clubs.

Formal competition games are held for A Grade, B Grade (Reserves) and Colts (Under 16). Informal under 12 games are also held. The league colours are black and white and carry the Magpies logo.

=== Clubs ===
Central Eyre Football Club (Kyancutta/Warramboo area)

The club formed 1987 in the former Le Hunte Football League for one season with the merger of Kyancutta FC and Warramboo FC. It joined the MWFL as a founding club in 1988 and won the first premiership of the newly formed league.

The earliest origin can be traced back to Kyancutta FC who were formed 1918, with Warramboo formed in 1929, and Cootra East, Waddikee Rovers and Palabie the other clubs who have been within the clubs drawing area.

The club shares two home grounds, in Kyancutta and Warramboo. They have the colours of red, white and blue and are known as the Bulldogs.

Elliston Football Club (Elliston area)

The club joined from the Le Hunte Football League as a foundation member of the MWFL.

Elliston FC is the second oldest football club on the Eyre Peninsula formed in 1904. (The oldest is Cowell FC in Eastern Eyre FL). Other clubs that have existed in the current drawing area include Colton/Wedge, Sheringa, Colton, Mount Wedge, Talia and Kolballa.

Their home ground is in Elliston. They wear the colours of red and white and are known as the Roosters.

West Coast Hawks Football Club (Streaky Bay/Piednippie area)

The club was formed in 1999 from the merger of the Streaky Bay FC and the Rovers FC. Both clubs were foundation members of the MWFL.

The origins may be traced back to Streaky Bay FC (formed 1906) and Rovers FC (formed 1913). Other clubs in the drawing area include Streaky Bay, Flinders United, and Flinders although the borders are blurred with Western Districts.

The club shares two home grounds, in Streaky Bay and Piednippie. They wear the colours of dark blue and gold and are known as the Hawks.

Western Districts Football Club (Minnipa/Poochera area)

The club formed in 1988 as a foundation member of the MWFL. It was a merger of the Central Areas FC from the Streaky Bay Football League and the Minnipa FC from the Le Hunte Football League.

The earliest origin can be traced back to Calca in 1913, although there is a blur of the borders between the feeder clubs of the current Western Districts and the West Coast Hawks. The clubs that have been in the drawing area include Minnipa FC (formed 1917), Central Areas (formed 1971), Calca Chandada, Poochera, Chandada, Calca-Kenny, Port Kenny and Collie.

The club shares two home grounds, in Poochera and Minnipa. They wear the colours of dark green and gold and are known as the Tigers.

Wirrulla Football Club (Wirrulla/Smoky Bay area)

The club joined from the Streaky Bay Football League as a foundation member of the MWFL.

Wirrulla FC was formed in 1919. Many clubs have existed in their area including Yantanabie United, Cungena, Yantanabie, Kangaroos, Excelsiors, Pimbacarra and Carawa.

The club's home ground is in Wirrulla, and they wear the colours of black and red and are known as the Bombers.

Wudinna United Football Club (Wudinna/Yaninee area)

The club formed in 1989 with the merger of Wudinna FC and United FC, who both competed in the Le Hunte Football League, and then one season as separate entities in MWFL in 1988.

The earliest origin is via Wudinna FC and Yaninee (both formed in 1918). Other clubs previously in the drawing area include United and Pygery.

Their home ground is in Wudinna, and they share the league colours of black and white and the Magpies logo.

== Clubs ==
=== Final ===
Club	Jumper	Nickname	Home Ground	Former League	Est.	Years in MWFL	MWFL Senior Premierships		Fate
Club	Jumper	Nickname	Home Ground	Former League	Est.	Years in MWFL	Total	Years	Fate
Central Eyre	(1980s-?)(?-2010s)(?-2020)	Bulldogs	Kyancutta Oval, Kyancutta and Warramboo Oval, Warramboo	LHFL	1987	1988-2020	9	1988, 1996, 1997, 1998, 1999, 2007, 2015, 2016, 2017	Merged with Wudinna United to form Central Eyre United in Eastern Eyre FL in 2021
Elliston	(1988-2005)(2006-19)	Roosters	Elliston Oval, Elliston	LHFL	1904	1988-2020	4	1995, 2000, 2012, 2018	Merged with Western Districts to form Elliston Districts in Great Flinders FL in 2021
West Coast Hawks		Hawks	Streaky Bay Community Complex Oval, Streaky Bay and Piednippie Oval, Piednippie	–	1999	1999-2020	9	2001, 2003, 2006, 2009, 2010, 2011, 2013, 2014, 2019	Moved to Western Eyre FL in 2021
Western Districts	(1980s-90s)(1990s-?)(?-2020)	Tigers	Minnipa Oval, Minnipa and Poochera Oval, Poochera	–	1988	1988-2020	2	2002, 2004	Merged with Elliston to form Elliston Districts in Great Flinders FL in 2021
Wirrulla	(1988-94)(1995-96)(1997-)	Bombers	Wirrulla Football Ground, Wirrulla	SBFA	1919	1988-2020	1	2008	Moved to Western Eyre FL in 2021
Wudinna United	(1989-?, ?-2020)(?-2005-?)	Magpies	Wudinna Oval, Wudinna	–	1989	1989-2020	4	1992, 1993, 1994, 2005	Merged with Central Eyre to form Central Eyre United in Eastern Eyre FL in 2021

=== Former ===
Club	Jumper	Nickname	Home Ground	Former League	Est.	Years in MWFL	MWFL Senior Premierships		Fate
Club	Jumper	Nickname	Home Ground	Former League	Est.	Years in MWFL	Total	Years	Fate
Rovers			Piednippie Oval, Piednippie	SBFA	1913	1988-1998	3	1989, 1990, 1991	Merged with Streaky Bay to form West Coast Hawks in 1999
Streaky Bay		Ospreys	Streaky Bay Community Complex Oval, Streaky Bay	SBFA	1906	1988-1998	0	-	Merged with Rovers to form West Coast Hawks in 1999
United		Magpies	Yaninee Oval, Yaninee	LHFL	1950	1988	0	-	Merged with Wudinna to form Wudinna United in 1989
Wudinna		Bloods	Wudinna Oval, Wudinna	LHFL	1918	1988	0	-	Merged with United to form Wudinna United in 1989

== Premierships by year ==
- 1988 Central Eyre
- 1989 Rovers
- 1990 Rovers
- 1991 Rovers
- 1992 Wudinna United
- 1993 Wudinna United
- 1994 Wudinna United
- 1995 Elliston
- 1996 Central Eyre
- 1997 Central Eyre
- 1998 Central Eyre
- 1999 Central Eyre
- 2000 Elliston
- 2001 West Coast Hawks
- 2002 Western Districts
- 2003 West Coast Hawks
- 2004 Western Districts
- 2005 Wudinna United
- 2006 West Coast Hawks
- 2007 Central Eyre
- 2008 Wirrulla
- 2009 West Coast Hawks
- 2010 West Coast Hawks
- 2011 West Coast Hawks
- 2012 Elliston
- 2013 West Coast Hawks
- 2014 West Coast Hawks
- 2015 Central Eyre
- 2016 Central Eyre
- 2017 Central Eyre
- 2018 Elliston
- 2019 West Coast Hawks
- 2020 Cancelled due to COVID-19 pandemic

== 2011 Ladder ==
Mid West	Wins	Byes	Losses	Draws	For	Against	%	Pts	Final	Team	G	B	Pts	Team	G	B	Pts
West Coast	13	0	2	0	1672	957	63.60%	26	1st Semi	Elliston	10	10	70	Western Districts	9	11	65
Central Eyre	11	0	4	0	1532	1218	55.71%	22	2nd Semi	West Coast	10	12	72	Central Eyre	9	9	63
Elliston	8	0	7	0	1315	1329	49.74%	16	Preliminary	Elliston	13	13	91	Central Eyre	9	30	84
Western Districts	6	0	9	0	1051	1209	46.50%	12	Grand	Elliston	14	9	93	West Coast	7	10	52
Wudinna United	5	0	10	0	1256	1383	47.59%	10									
Wirrulla	2	0	13	0	922	1652	35.82%	4									

== 2012 Ladder ==
Mid West	Wins	Byes	Losses	Draws	For	Against	%	Pts	Final	Team	G	B	Pts	Team	G	B	Pts
West Coast	14	0	1	0	1766	846	67.61%	28	1st Semi	Western Districts	10	11	71	Wudinna United	10	5	65
Central Eyre	12	0	2	1	2270	601	79.07%	25	2nd Semi	Central Eyre	14	9	93	West Coast	14	8	92
Western Districts	9	0	6	0	993	1093	47.60%	18	Preliminary	West Coast	15	17	107	Western Districts	5	9	39
Wudinna United	5	0	10	0	1018	1783	36.34%	10	Grand	West Coast	12	13	85	Central Eyre	7	11	53
Elliston	3	0	12	0	953	1858	33.90%	6									
Wirrulla	1	0	13	1	918	1737	34.58%	3									

== 2013 Ladder ==
Mid West	Wins	Byes	Losses	Draws	For	Against	%	Pts	Final	Team	G	B	Pts	Team	G	B	Pts
Central Eyre	13	0	2	0	1983	821	70.72%	26	1st Semi	Ellison	15	11	101	Western Districts	7	11	53
West Coast	12	0	3	0	1770	760	69.96%	24	2nd Semi	West Coast	16	16	112	Central Eyre	8	15	63
Western Districts	9	0	6	0	1139	1177	49.18%	18	Preliminary	Central Eyre	16	11	107	Ellison	15	8	98
Elliston	6	0	9	0	992	1522	39.46%	12	Grand	West Coast	16	9	105	Central Eyre	12	10	82
Wirrulla	4	0	11	0	1179	1682	41.21%	8									
Wudinna United	1	0	14	0	804	1905	29.68%	2									

== 2014 Ladder ==
Mid West	Wins	Byes	Losses	Draws	For	Against	%	Pts	Final	Team	G	B	Pts	Team	G	B	Pts
Central Eyre	13	0	2	0	1983	821	70.72%	26	1st Semi	Ellison	15	11	101	Western Districts	7	11	53
West Coast	12	0	3	0	1770	760	69.96%	24	2nd Semi	West Coast	16	16	112	Central Eyre	8	15	63
Western Districts	9	0	6	0	1139	1177	49.18%	18	Preliminary	Central Eyre	16	11	107	Ellison	15	8	98
Elliston	6	0	9	0	992	1522	39.46%	12	Grand	West Coast	16	9	105	Central Eyre	12	10	82
Wirrulla	4	0	11	0	1179	1682	41.21%	8									
Wudinna United	1	0	14	0	804	1905	29.68%	2									

== 2015 Ladder ==
Mid West	Wins	Byes	Losses	Draws	For	Against	%	Pts	Final	Team	G	B	Pts	Team	G	B	Pts
West Coast	15	0	0	0	1697	713	70.41%	30	1st Semi	Wirrulla	15	11	101	Wudinna United	9	9	63
Central Eyre	11	0	4	0	1580	873	64.41%	22	2nd Semi	West Coast	13	14	92	Central Eyre	9	11	65
Wirrulla	9	0	6	0	1388	1042	57.12%	18	Preliminary	Central Eyre	17	11	113	Wirrulla	6	5	41
Wudinna United	5	0	10	0	738	1158	38.92%	10	Grand	Central Eyre	20	15	135	West Coast	10	10	70
Western Districts	3	0	12	0	850	1179	41.89%	6									
Elliston	2	0	13	0	733	2021	26.62%	4									

== 2016 Ladder ==
Mid West	Wins	Byes	Losses	Draws	For	Against	%	Pts	Final	Team	G	B	Pts	Team	G	B	Pts
Central Eyre	15	0	0	0	2402	608	79.80%	30	1st Semi	Wirrulla	15	15	105	Wudinna United	9	4	58
West Coast	12	0	3	0	1577	874	64.34%	24	2nd Semi	Central Eyre	11	25	91	West Coast	7	5	47
Wirrulla	8	0	7	0	1123	1286	46.62%	16	Preliminary	West Coast	15	12	102	Wirrulla	4	8	32
Wudinna United	4	0	11	0	709	1570	31.11%	8	Grand	Central Eyre	14	11	95	West Coast	6	7	43
Elliston	3	0	12	0	881	1374	39.07%	6									
Western Districts	3	0	12	0	704	1684	29.48%	6									

== 2017 Ladder ==
Mid West	Wins	Byes	Losses	Draws	For	Against	%	Pts	Final	Team	G	B	Pts	Team	G	B	Pts
West Coast	15	0	0	0	1991	642	75.62%	30	1st Semi	Elliston	12	15	87	Western Districts	13	7	85
Central Eyre	12	0	3	0	1953	860	69.43%	24	2nd Semi	Central Eyre	9	14	68	West Coast	9	7	61
Western Districts	8	0	7	0	1050	1314	44.42%	16	Preliminary	West Coast	12	11	83	Elliston	11	6	72
Elliston	6	0	9	0	1285	1427	47.38%	12	Grand	Central Eyre	17	14	116	West Coast	12	3	75
Wirrulla	3	0	11	1	643	1850	25.79%	7									
Wudinna United	0	0	14	1	817	1646	33.17%	1									

== 2018 Ladder ==
Mid West	Wins	Byes	Losses	Draws	For	Against	%	Pts	Final	Team	G	B	Pts	Team	G	B	Pts
West Coast	14	0	1	0	1785	761	70.11%	28	1st Semi	Wirrulla	12	10	82	Central Eyre	6	7	43
Elliston	11	0	4	0	1474	916	61.67%	22	2nd Semi	West Coast	13	13	91	Elliston	9	11	65
Central Eyre	8	0	7	0	1107	1378	44.55%	16	Preliminary	Elliston	12	11	83	Wirrulla	10	6	66
Wirrulla	7	0	8	0	1138	1270	47.26%	14	Grand	Elliston	9	12	66	West Coast	8	7	55
Western Districts	4	0	11	0	1149	1222	48.46%	8									
Wudinna United	1	0	14	0	633	1739	26.69%	2									

== Books ==
- Encyclopedia of South Australian country football clubs / compiled by Peter Lines. ISBN 9780980447293
- South Australian country football digest / by Peter Lines ISBN 9780987159199
