= Karkoo, South Australia =

Karkoo South Australia
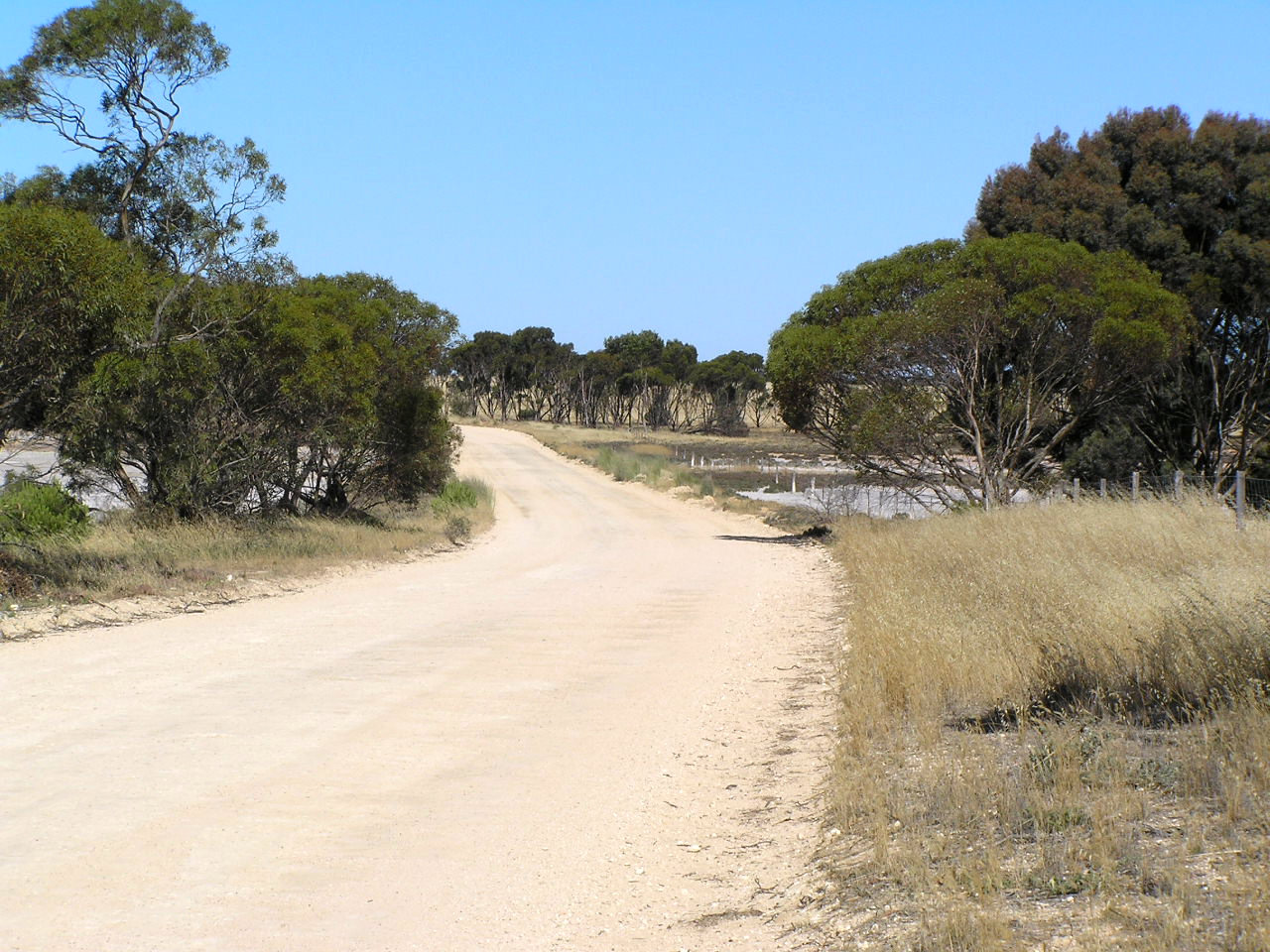
- Wagner Road near Karkoo

- Coordinates: 34°2′S 135°44′E
- Population: 52 (SAL 2021)
- Postcode(s): 5632 since 1 July 2012 (previously 5607)
- Location: 63 km (39 mi) north of Port Lincoln
- LGA(s): District Council of Lower Eyre Peninsula
- Region: Eyre Western
- County: Musgrave
- State electorate(s): Flinders
- Federal division(s): Grey
Localities around Karkoo:
	Tooligie	Hincks
Mitchell	Karkoo	Brooker
Kapinnie	Yeelanna

Karkoo is a small rural centre located 20 km to the north of Cummins in the centre of Eyre Peninsula, South Australia. It is located in an agricultural district where the main economic activities are cereal growing (mainly wheat and barley) and sheep grazing, and most of the district's small population live on surrounding farms.

The town of Karkoo itself has only a few residences and facilities, which include a district hall and Country Fire Service brigade. The nearest shops are in the nearby town of Cummins.

Karkoo Primary School opened as the "Hundred of Shannon School" in 1909 and was renamed Karkoo in 1937. It closed at the end of the 2010 school year due to low student numbers. Karkoo Post Office opened on 1 April 1933 and closed on 29 April 1988.

Karkoo is connected with Port Lincoln to the south and Lock to the north by the Tod Highway and by the narrow gauge Eyre Peninsula Railway.

The bounded locality of Karkoo surrounding the town includes the Shannon Conservation Park in its northwestern corner.

Karkoo is located within the federal division of Grey, the state electoral district of Flinders and the local government area of the District Council of Lower Eyre Peninsula.

== See also ==
- List of cities and towns in South Australia
