= Mount Hope, South Australia =

Mount Hope
- Town
- Coordinates: 34°06′38″S 135°21′11″E
- Country: Australia
- State: South Australia
- Region: Eyre Western
- LGA: District Council of Lower Eyre Peninsula
- Location: 310 km (190 mi) W of Adelaide; 80 km (50 mi) W of Port Lincoln
- Established: 30 Nov 1916 (town)

Government
  - State electorate: Flinders
  - Federal division: Grey
- Elevation: 52 m (171 ft)

Population
  - Total: 41 (SAL 2021)
- Time zone: UTC+9:30 (ACST)
  - Summer (DST): UTC+10:30 (ACST)
- Postcode: 5607
- County: Flinders; Musgrave
Localities around Mount Hope
Great Australian Bight	Kiana	Mitchell
Great Australian Bight	Mount Hope	Mitchell; Kapinnie
Great Australian Bight	Mount Drummond	Kapinnie

Mount Hope is a small town on the Flinders Highway on the west coast of Eyre Peninsula in South Australia, part of the traditional territory of the Nauo people. The geographical feature was so-named by Edward John Eyre, who passed that way in 1839.

Mount Hope is located within the federal division of Grey, the state electoral district of Flinders and the local government area of the District Council of Lower Eyre Peninsula.

The school opened in 1911 and closed in 1974. In 1912, it had an non-denominational Sunday School run by the same teacher as taught in the school for the rest of the week. It was the terminus of a branch of the Eyre Peninsula Railway from Yeelanna from 1914, but the line was closed and dismantled in 1966.

In the 1960s, Mount Hope and Elliston's only connection with the national telephone network was via a 160 MHz radio link to Mount Lofty, supplied by the PMG's department.

There was once a Mount Hope near Rendelsham in the South East of South Australia, named for the Hope brothers, early pastoralists. A suggestion was made that it be renamed Mount Woakwine, presumably for the Woakwine Range and the Woakwine homestead, but neither name is now significant.

== See also ==
- List of cities and towns in South Australia
