= Eyre Peninsula Railway Preservation Society =

The Eyre Peninsula Railway Preservation Society is a historical society located in Port Lincoln, South Australia, which opened in September 1999. It is based at the heritage listed Port Lincoln railway station which it operates as a railway museum.

The museum includes a number of exhibits and collectibles from the Eyre Peninsula Railway including locomotive 850 and a HAN type grain hopper (specifically designed for grain haulage on the network), as well as items from the nearby Coffin Bay Tramway.
