= Yeelanna =

Yeelanna may refer to:

- Yeelanna, South Australia
- Yeelanna (genus), an insect genus in the family Pyrgomorphidae
