= Kiana, South Australia =

Kiana
- Town
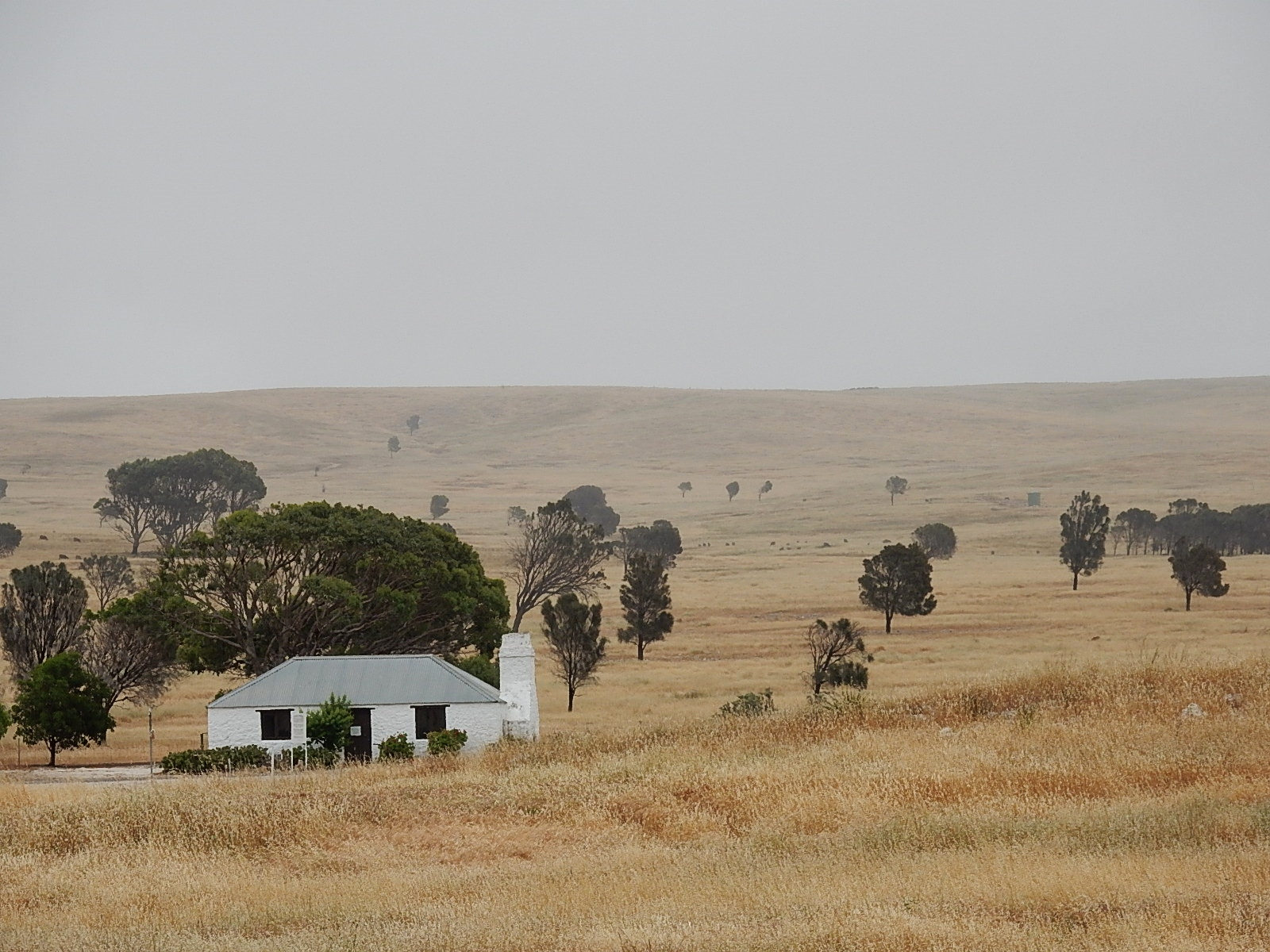

- Coordinates: 33.946878°S 135.273688°E
- Country: Australia
- State: South Australia
- LGA: District Council of Lower Eyre Peninsula

Government
  - State electorate: Flinders
  - Federal division: Grey

Population
  - Total: 10 (SAL 2021)
- Postcode: 5607
Localities around Kiana
Great Australian Bight	Sheringa	Tooligie
Great Australian Bight	Kiana	Mitchell
Great Australian Bight	Mount Hope	Mitchell

Kiana is a coastal locality on the Eyre Peninsula of South Australia, situated within the District Council of Lower Eyre Peninsula. The modern boundaries were formally established in October 2003, with it being named after the cadastral Hundred of Kiana. The modern locality only covers the northern half of the hundred; the southern half is the locality of Mount Hope. The hundred itself was given an Aboriginal name by Governor William Jervois in 1879.

The west of the locality is dominated by the natural feature of Lake Hamilton. The lake is seven miles long and one mile wide, and was named by Edward John Eyre in 1840 after George Hamilton, the Commissioner of Police at the time. The Flinders Highway runs north–south along the strip between the lake and the ocean. Kiana Beach is located 1.5 km west of the highway, with a vehicle track to the northern and southern ends. Surf Life Saving Australia defines the southern end as "very hazardous" and "rip-dominated" and the northern end as "safer but difficult to access on foot". It is a popular beach for fishing.

The historic ruins of the Lake Hamilton Homestead complex survive off Flinders Highway, including those of the former drafting yards, shearing shed, cemetery, outbuildings, mess hut and store. The intact Lake Hamilton Eating House, dating from the 1850s-1860s, is the last former coach stopping point of its type left standing on the Eyre Peninsula. It was restored by the Port Lincoln Caledonian Society in 1972. Both the homestead ruins and the eating house are listed on the South Australian Heritage Register.
