= Port Lincoln railway station =

Former railway station in South Australia, Australia

Port Lincoln
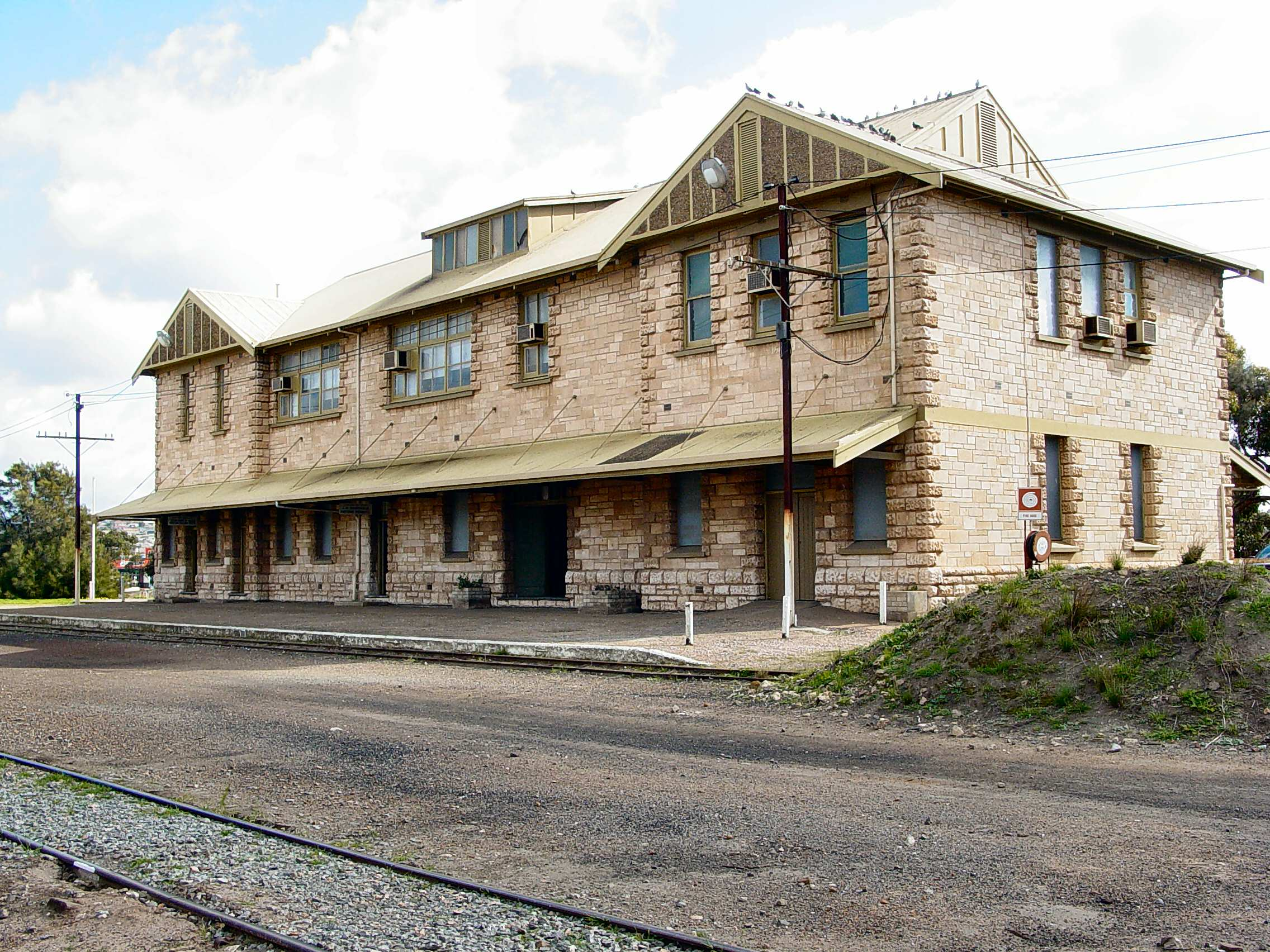
- Port Lincoln station in August 2005

General information
- Location: Railway Place, Port Lincoln
- Coordinates: 34.7242°S 135.8671°E
- Owner: Department of Planning, Transport & Infrastructure
- Operator: South Australian Railways
- Line: Eyre Peninsula Railway
- Platforms: 1

Other information
- Status: Closed

History
- Opened: 1908
- Closed: 1968
- Rebuilt: 1927
Location

Port Lincoln railway station is located on the Eyre Peninsula Railway in the South Australian city of Port Lincoln.

== History ==
The original Port Lincoln station opened in 1908 with a timber building. It was replaced by a two-storey stone and reinforced concrete building in 1927. As well as serving as the South Australian Railways' Eyre Peninsula Railway divisional headquarters, the Adelaide Steamship Company had an office and waiting room within the station. The station closed in 1968 with the cessation of passenger services. It was added to the South Australian Heritage Register in 1993.

== Current use of building ==
The Eyre Peninsula Railway Preservation Society opened in September 1999 on the ground floor with the freight shed opening as an extension in December 2004. It does have some former South Australian Railways and Coffin Bay Tramway wagons as well as an 830 class locomotive, number 850.
