= City of Port Lincoln =

- Local government area
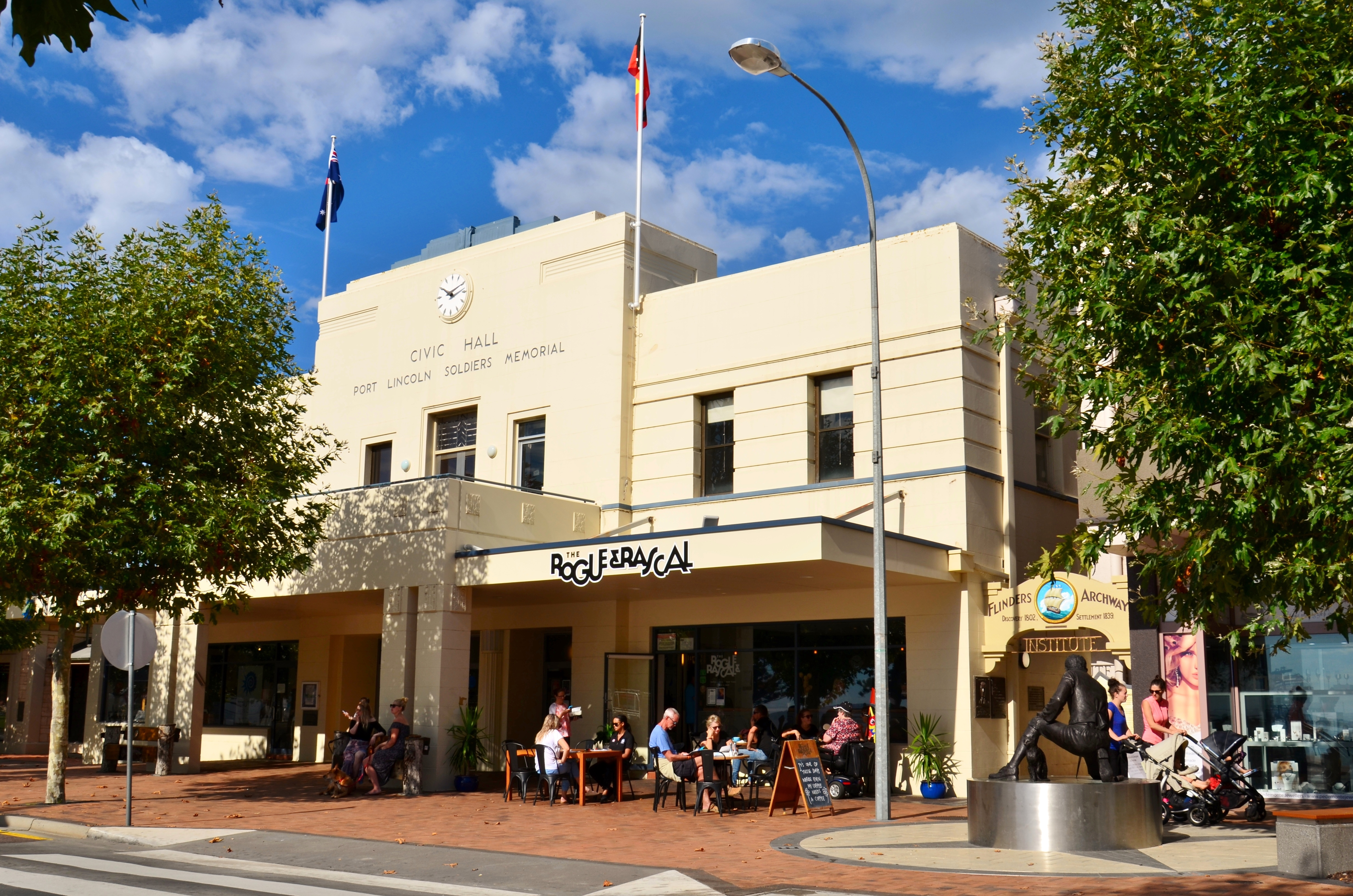
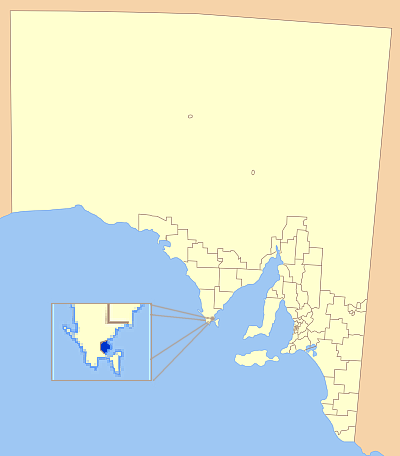
- Port Lincoln Civic Hall Location of the City of Port Lincoln LGA

- Interactive map of City of Port Lincoln
- Coordinates: 34.7203°S 135.858°E
- Country: Australia
- State: South Australia
- Region: Eyre Western
- Established: 1880
- Council seat: Port Lincoln

Government
  - Mayor: Diana Mislov
  - State electorate: Flinders
  - Federal division: Grey

Area
  - Total: 30.4 km^{2} (11.7 sq mi)

Population
  - Total: 14,404 (LGA 2021)
  - Density: 435.30/km^{2} (1,127.4/sq mi)
- Website: City of Port Lincoln
LGAs around City of Port Lincoln
District Council of Lower Eyre Peninsula
	City of Port Lincoln

The City of Port Lincoln is a local government area located on the southern tip of the Eyre Peninsula in South Australia. It consists of one suburb - Port Lincoln. It is surrounded on land by the District Council of Lower Eyre Peninsula, which also has offices in Port Lincoln.

== History ==
The area was discovered and mapped by Matthew Flinders in 1802, who named the body of water Port Lincoln after his home county of Lincolnshire in England.

The first white settlers in the area arrived in 1839, travelling from Port Adelaide on the Abeona. The settlement at Port Lincoln grew from 150 in the immediate aftermath of their arrival to 270 by 1840, and on 29 June 1839, Port Lincoln was designated as an official port for trade. The town experienced strong development, and by 1936 was regarded as "the principal seaport town of the Eyre Peninsula, as well as being a "favourite holiday resort" with sea connections from Port Adelaide.

The district first gained local government in 1880, when the District Council of Lincoln was created for the Port Lincoln area, holding its first meeting in the Pier Hotel in July. It was variously referred to in period newspapers as either the "Port Lincoln" or "Lincoln" council, but the landmark District Councils Act 1887, which undertook a major reorganisation of South Australian local government, referred to it as the District Council of Lincoln.

The City of Port Lincoln municipality was created when the town of Port Lincoln incorporated and seceded from the district council in 1921, becoming the Corporate Town of Port Lincoln. It gained its present name when it was granted city status on 21 January 1971. The former District Council of Lincoln was renamed the District Council of Lower Eyre Peninsula in 1988, and continues to serve the rural areas surrounding Port Lincoln.

== Localities ==
The boundaries of the City of Port Lincoln are almost contiguous with the town of Port Lincoln itself; a small portion of western Port Lincoln falls into the District Council of Lower Eyre Peninsula, while a very small section of adjacent Boston falls within the Port Lincoln municipality.

== Elected members ==
Ward	Councillor	Notes
Mayor	Diana Mislov	
Unsubdivided	Andrea Broadfoot	
Unsubdivided	Dylan Cowley	
Unsubdivided	Karen Hollamby	
Unsubdivided	Peter Linn	
Unsubdivided	Lillian Poynter	
Unsubdivided	Shania Richards	
Unsubdivided	Jack Ritchie	Deputy Mayor 28/10/2022 - 18/10/2024
Unsubdivided	Robyn Rowsell	Deputy Mayor 18/10/2024 - Present
Unsubdivided	Valerie Staunton	

The City of Port Lincoln has a directly-elected mayor.

== Mayors of Port Lincoln ==
- Joseph Scoresby Shepherd (1921-1923)
- Arthur Leech (1923-1928)
- David Otto Whait (1928-1933)
- Richard Francis Poole (1933-1939)
- Albert Kent Mullner (1939-1940)
- Richard Francis Poole (1940-1944)
- Herbert Heath Bascombe (1944-1949)
- Joseph Patrick O'Leary (1949-1950)
- William Arthur Trigg (1950-1954)
- Percival Lincoln Puckridge (1954-1967)
- Harold John Freeman (1967-1973)
- Ilmar Tohver (1973-1976)
- Harold Franklin Hunt (1976-1978)
- Geoffrey Rex Davey (1978-1981)
- Thomas George Secker (1981-1993)
- Ronald Vincent Carey (1993-1995)
- Peter Woodley Davis (1995-2010)
- Bruce Green (2010–2018)
- Bradley Brian Flaherty (2018-2022)
- Diana Lucia Mislov (2022-present)
