= Yeelanna, South Australia =

Yeelanna
- Town
- Coordinates: 34°08′24″S 135°43′44″E
- Country: Australia
- State: South Australia
- Region: Eyre Western
- LGA: District Council of Lower Eyre Peninsula
- Location: 398 km (247 mi) W of Adelaide; 77 km (48 mi) N of Port Lincoln; 14 km (8.7 mi) N of Cummins
- Established: 1904

Government
  - State electorate: Flinders
  - Federal division: Grey

Population
  - Total: 85 (SAL 2021)
- Postcode: 5632
- County: Flinders
Localities around Yeelanna
Mitchell	Karkoo
Kapinnie	Yeelanna	Brooker
	Cummins	Cockaleechie

Yeelanna (an Aboriginal word meaning "Local Spring") is a town on the Lower Eyre Peninsula in South Australia located 77 kilometres (48 mi) north of Port Lincoln. It is on the Tod Highway and Eyre Peninsula Railway between Lock and Cummins. The Yeelanna district is known for its extremely fertile farming land, where nearly all farms in the district are continuously cropped.

== History ==
The aboriginal Nauo Tribe were the first people in the area. In the early days the area was known as Shannon and the first white settlers came to the district in 1904. The township was surveyed in 1908 and was first called Bellwood, but the name of the towns railway siding called Yeelanna stuck. Yeelanna had a policeman in the early days who lived in a tent, and there were two brick cells there for the wrong-doers. A large dam was dug in 1909 and supplied the township in the early days, and later was connected to the Yeelanna oval to water it for football and cricket. Yeelanna had a butcher shop, a blacksmith shop and a 19-room hotel in the early days. The hotel opened in 1912 and closed in 1924, it was then dismantled and the stone was transported to Kimba to build the current Kimba Gateway Hotel. Also, there was a bank, a bakery until the 1950s, a boarding house that opened in 1910 and a primary school that opened in 1908 and closed in 1972. The school is now the Bellwood Museum. There was a railway station, five railway cottages that were demolished in the mid to late 1970s, and a couple of mechanical businesses. The town had two shops in the early 1980s, with one being also a post office. The last shop closed was the Yeelanna General Store in the late 1980s. There were five fuel agents in town, with at least two still being there in the 1990s. There is still one mechanical business.

The old oval owned by the Yeelanna Memorial Association is used to put in a crop by the Yeelanna Memorial Association to help with their funds. The Recreational Park with the new oval was created in the 1950s and the new oval was used until around 2003–04 when the new oval was last used by the Karkoo/Yeelanna cricket club. The part of the recreation ground where the new oval was, has been sold and a new house and shed built on it where a spraying and windrowing business is run from, but the part of the recreation ground where the toilets, tennis and netball courts are remain in public ownership.

The town has a Hall with public toilets, a post office in one of the front rooms of the Yeelanna Hall, grain silos that were built in the 1960s and a railway line that has been there since around 1908 and transported grain to Port Lincoln for export until 2018 when all grain transportation on Eyre Peninsula went by Road Train, fourteen houses, a Uniting Church, a CFS brigade, an Agriculture Bureau that has existed since 1908 that is the Yeelanna/Karkoo Ag Bureau that has their meetings at the Kooplex at Karkoo, a Country Woman's Association, a museum called Bellewood Museum, and a historic cemetery. The town has a table tennis club, that plays its home matches in the Yeelanna Hall, and was established in 1939 and were Great Flinders table tennis association Premiers in 2019, back to back premiers in 06/07 and in 2007 were undefeated Premiers. Yeelanna Football club was formed in 1909 and the Netball club in about 1934 and amalgamated with the United(Karkoo and Murdinga area) football and netball clubs in 1964 to form the United Yeelanna Football and Netball clubs. The amalgamated club kept using the blue and gold Yeelanna colours. Yeelanna football and netball clubs played at three home ground's being Murdinga, Karkoo and Yeelanna. They stopped playing at Murdinga in 1974 and Yeelanna at the end of the 1994 season. In 2014 United Yeelanna won the football Premierships in the A, B and colts (under 16's) grades, and in the netball won the Premierships in the A-Reserves, and B-grade and in 2015 and 2016 United Yeelanna's football clubs A grade won Premierships to win three Premierships in a row and United Yeelanna's netball clubs A- Reserves won Premierships in 2015 and 2016 as well to also win three Premierships in a row. Yeelanna cricket club formed in about 1911 and amalgamated with Karkoo in around 2000/01 to become the Karkoo/Yeelanna cricket club. The amalgamated club used the blue and gold Yeelanna colours and stopped playing at Yeelanna in around 03/04. The Karkoo/Yeelanna cricket club were undefeated premiers in 2016/17 season their first premiership as a merged club. Yeelanna tennis club formed in the early days of the township and had a team until the late 1980s, that then folded and the Yeelanna players joined with neighbouring club at Karkoo. The Yeelanna colours have been merged in with the Karkoo tennis club, reflecting the area the Karkoo tennis club represents, with many Yeelanna people playing for the Karkoo tennis club, with Karkoo Blue winning back to back premierships in 2013/14 2014/15 seasons and Karkoo were premiers in 2016/17

== Church ==
Yeelanna Uniting Church is part of the Western Eyre Uniting Churches Parish. The church is located in Bell Terrace, opposite the museum and welcomes people from many different Christian backgrounds. A Sunday school and youth group operate from the church.

== See also ==
- List of cities and towns in South Australia
