= Eyre Peninsula Railway =

Railway on the Eyre Peninsula, South Australia

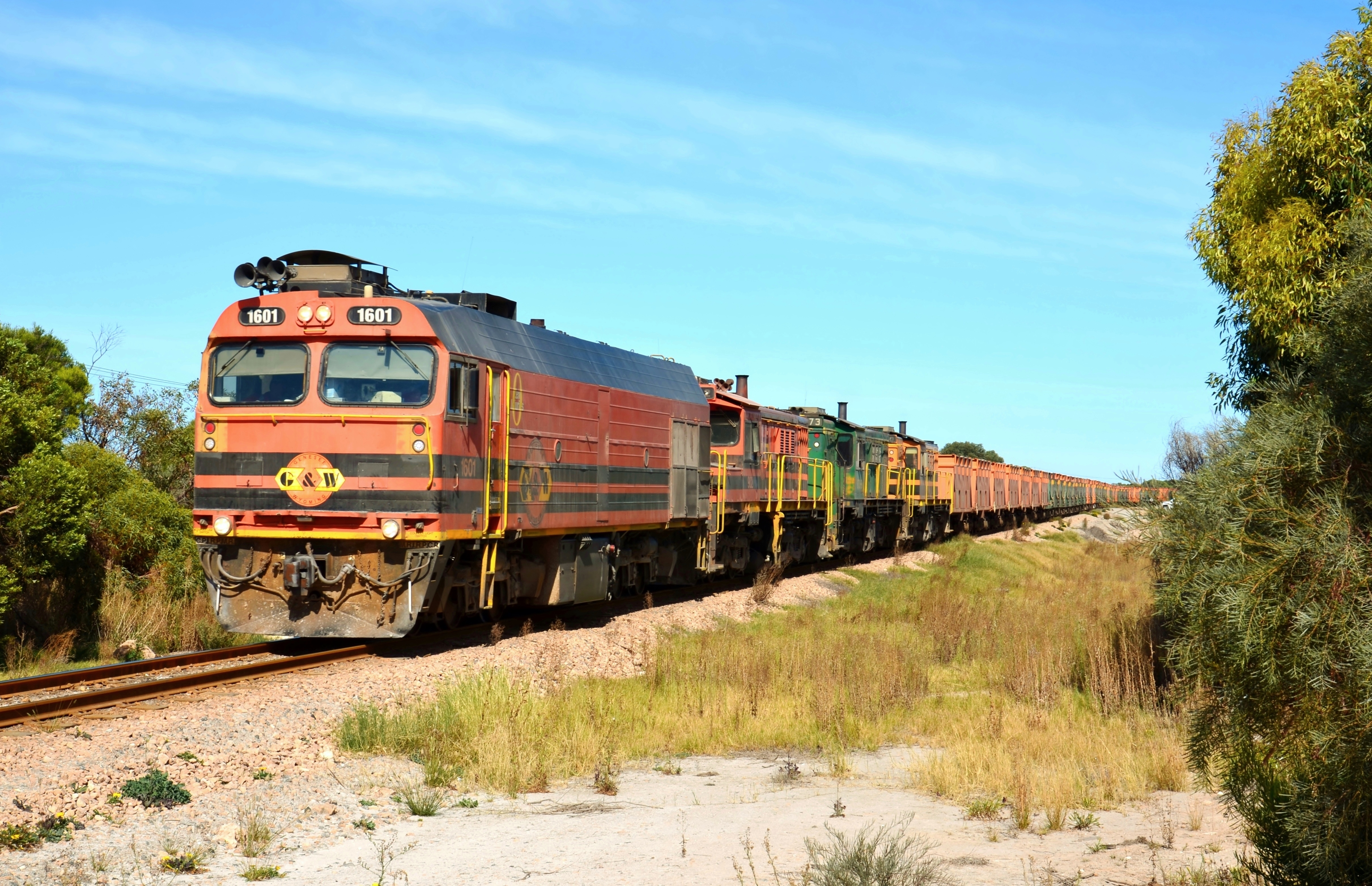
- Genesee & Wyoming Australia empty gypsum train at Thevenard in April 2017

Overview
- Status: Open, mostly disused
- Owner: Government of South Australia
- Termini: Port Lincoln; Buckleboo Penong Mount Hope

Service
- Operator(s): Aurizon
- Depot(s): 1

History
- First section opened: 18 November 1907
- Maximum length reached: 11 April 1950
- Grain services ceased: 31 May 2019

Technical
- Line length: 777 km (483 mi)
- Track gauge: 1,067 mm (3 ft 6 in)
- Signalling: Train Order Working

The Eyre Peninsula Railway is a 1,067 mm (3 ft 6 in) gauge railway on the Eyre Peninsula of South Australia. Radiating out from the ports at Port Lincoln and Thevenard, it is isolated from the rest of the South Australian railway network. It peaked at 777 kilometres in 1950; today only a 60 kilometre section remains open. It is currently operated by Aurizon.

== History ==
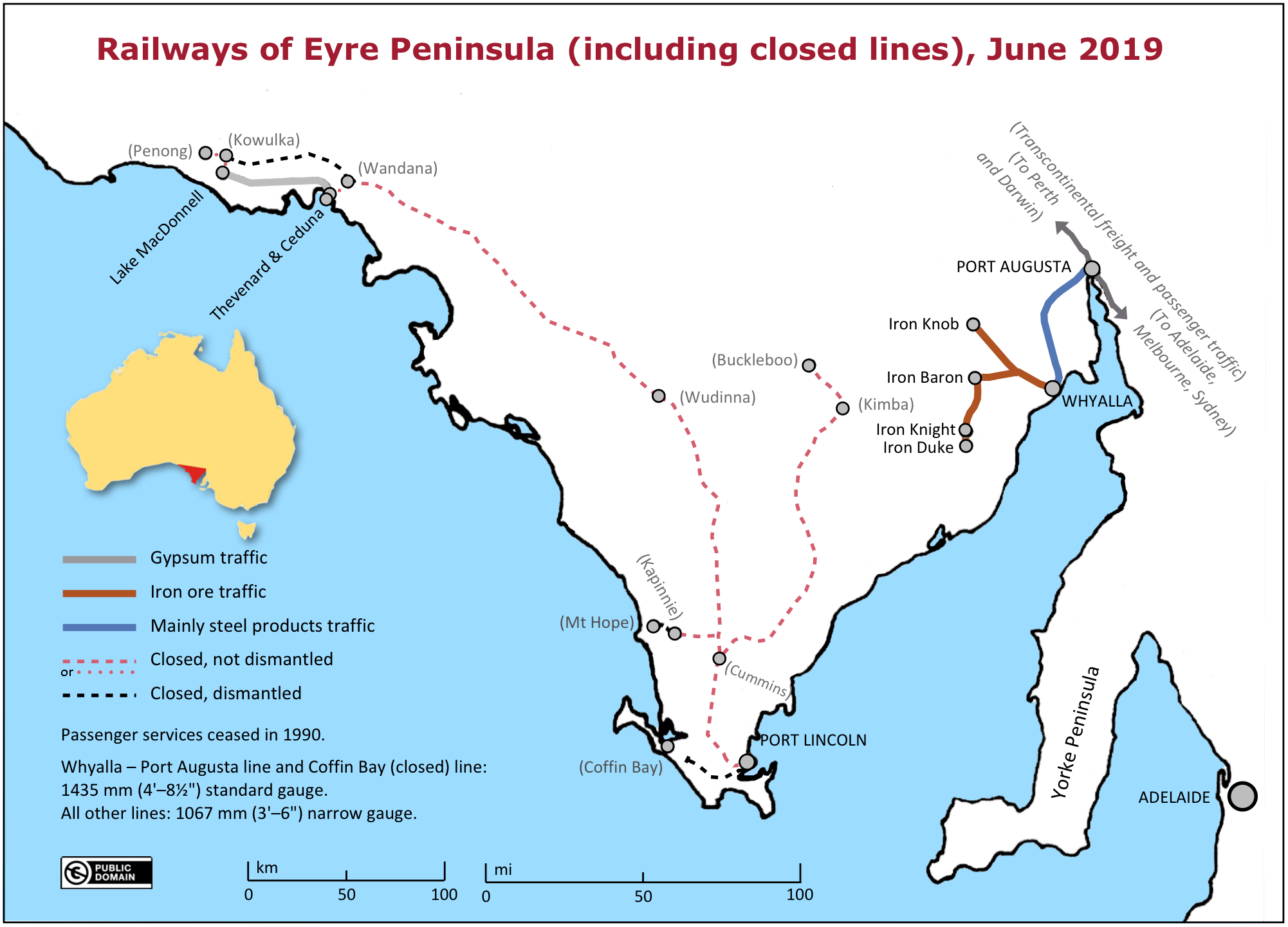
Map of operational and closed railway lines of Eyre Peninsula in 2019

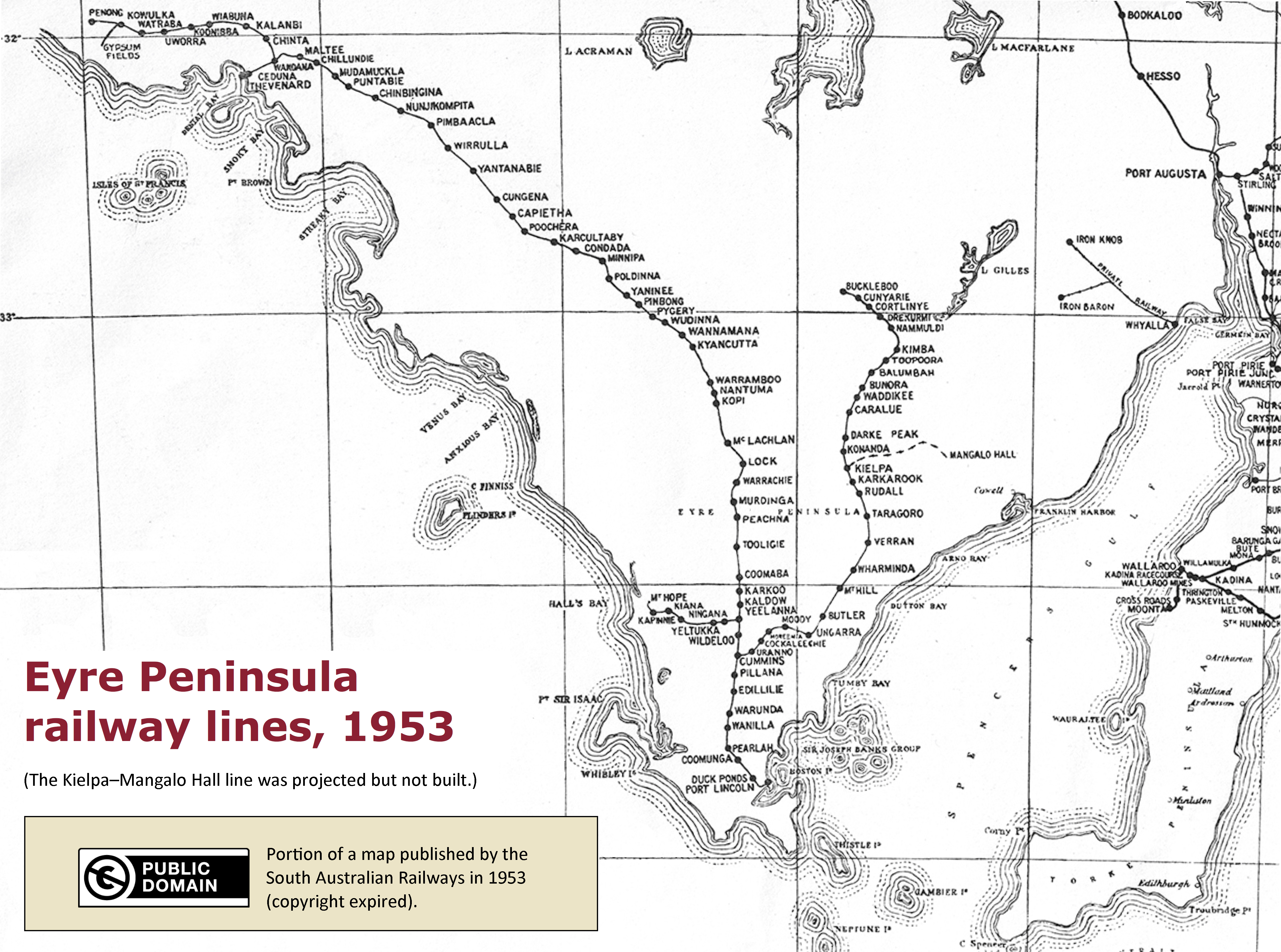
Map of the railway lines of Eyre Peninsula in 1953, showing stations and stopping places

The Eyre Peninsula Railway was built and operated by South Australian Railways (SAR). As with many other early narrow-gauge railways in South Australia, the Eyre Peninsula lines started out as isolated lines connecting small ports to the inland, opening up the country for settlement and economic life including export of grain and other produce in an environment with few roads and only horse-drawn road vehicles. The railway has always been isolated from the main network. A proposal to link it with the rest of the network at Port Augusta was rejected in the 1920s and again in the 1950s.

The first 67 km from Port Lincoln to Cummins opened on 18 November 1907, followed by extensions to Yeelanna on 1 April 1909, Minnipa on 5 May 1913, Nunjikompita on 14 August 1914 and Thevenard on 8 February 1915, a total of 434 km. A second line opened from Cummins to Moody on 1 August 1912, being extended to Ungarra on 31 March 1913, Kimba on 11 July 1913 and Buckleboo on 5 August 1926, a distance of 213 km.

Branch lines off the original line opened from Yeelanna to Mount Hope on 9 October 1914, a distance of 38 km and from Wandana to Penong on 7 February 1924, a distance of 83 km. A further nine-kilometre branch from Kevin to Kowulka opened on 11 April 1950. This was the peak of the network's size at 777 km.

The Mount Hope line was truncated by 15 km on 12 July 1965, with Kapinnie becoming its terminus. The remaining section closed in October 2002.

The original route for gypsum traffic had followed a circuitous, 103 km (64 mi) route, via Kowulka and Wandana, from the mine at Kevin to the port at Thevenard. The ruling grade was 1 in 80. In 1966, a 58 km (36 mi) line with a ruling grade of 1 in 120 was opened from Kevin to Penong Junction. The line from Wandana to Kowulka was closed. In 1984 the Thevenard unloading facility was upgraded with a balloon loop.

The Eyre Peninsula Railway was included in the March 1978 takeover of SAR by Australian National Railways Commission and the November 1997 sale of Australian National's South Australian freight business to Genesee & Wyoming, which included a 50-year lease on the rail network from the state government until 2047.

The last grain train from Kevin to Penong operated on 3 March 1997 with the line reverting to state government ownership on 30 June 2001. Due to a poor harvest resulting from drought, the last grain train north of Cummins to Kimba ran on 20 December 2018.

=== Cessation of grain traffic ===
Grain trains ceased operating in May 2019, when Viterra moved its business to road haulage, leaving only gypsum traffic on the Lake MacDonnell–Thevenard railway line remaining. The network technically remains open as no lines have formally been "closed". However, from an operational standpoint, the lines are closed, and all level crossings on the disused sections now have ‘Railway crossing not in use’ signs. Since April 2005, grain trains had only operated from Port Lincoln to Wudinna and Kimba. The workshops in Port Lincoln initially remained open for maintenance of rail vehicles brought by road from Whyalla and Thevenard, but the workshops subsequently closed and some mechanical equipment was transferred to Adelaide for use at the Motive Power Centre at Dry Creek. Maintenance is now carried out at Progress Rail's Port Augusta workshops; rolling stock is transferred there via road.

The Wudinna to Penong Junction section remained open to facilitate rolling stock movements to and from the Port Lincoln workshops. Gypsum trains continue to operate from the Lake MacDonnell mine at Kevin to Thevenard for Gypsum Resources Australia, a joint venture between Boral and CSR. A final light engine movement from Port Lincoln to Thevenard ran on 26 June 2019.

Operation of the Eyre Peninsula Railway was acquired by Aurizon in their purchase of One Rail Australia (previously Genesee & Wyoming Australia); the sale was finalised on 29 July 2022. (Note: The parties were Aurizon Holdings Ltd (the acquirer) and various entities of Macquarie Asset Management (MAM), on behalf of MAM's funds, and PGGM Infrastructure Fund, to acquire 100% of One Rail Australia Holdings LP (the target), the South Australian limited partnership that owned the One Rail Australia business.)

=== Proposal for upgrading and re-opening ===
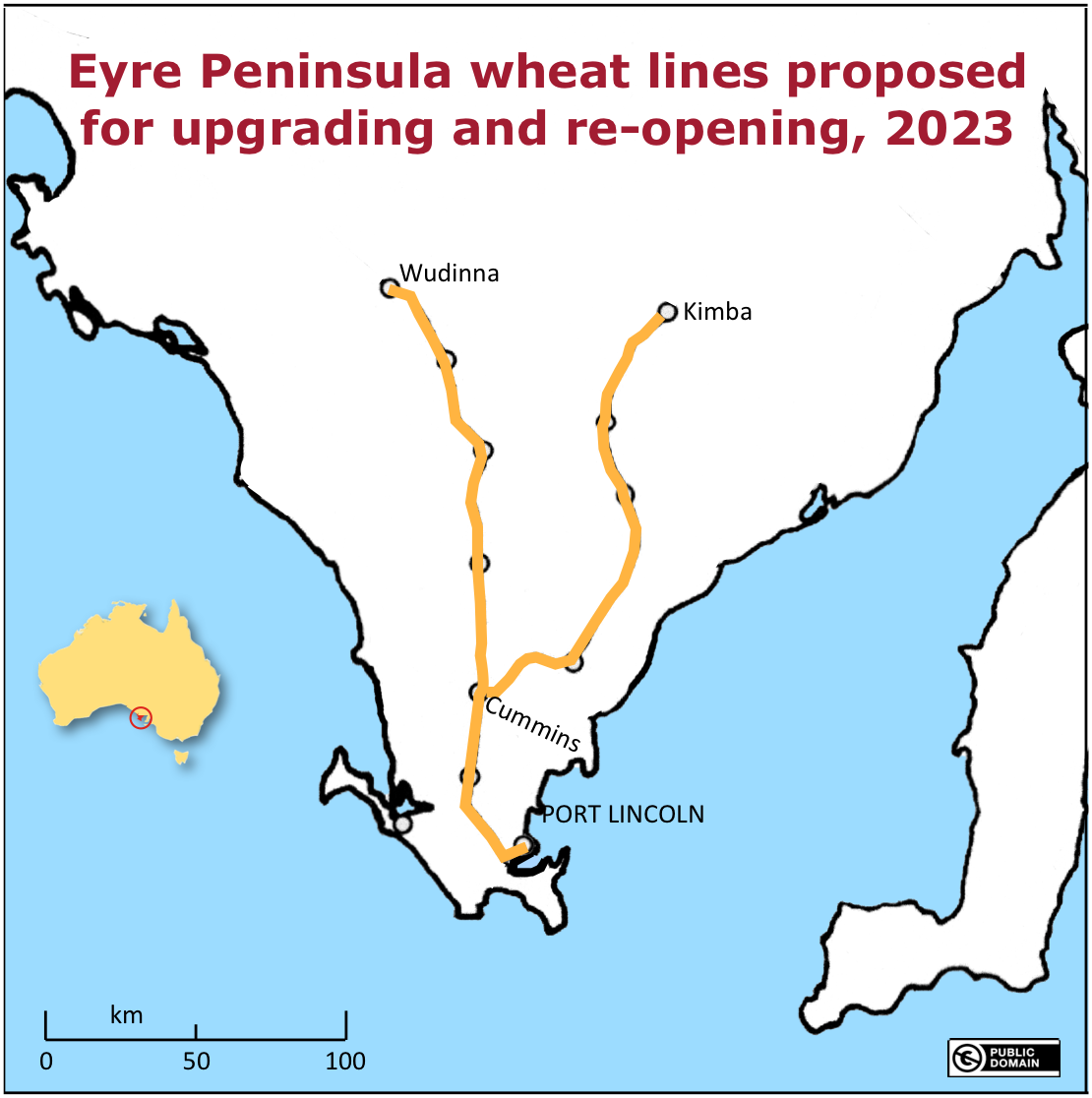
The wheat haulage lines proposed for upgrading and re-opening

In March 2023, Aurizon and grain-handling company Viterra applied to the Australian Government for A$220 million to upgrade the abandoned lines on the lower Eyre Peninsula so that heavier, faster (and therefore more efficient) trains could operate than previously. The lines would be Port Lincoln–Wudinna and Cummins–Kimba. The proposal included upgrading of the outloading facilities at Viterra's sites at Lock, Wudinna, Cummins, Kimba and Rudall, and reducing turnaround times and increasing volume at Port Lincoln. The proposal envisaged hauling at least 1.3 million tonnes (1.4 megatons) per year and reopening within 12 months of approval of funding. Benefits would include reduction of about 25,000 t (25,000 long tons) of CO_{2} equivalent a year and removal of about 42,000 truck movements from Eyre Peninsula roads. General manager of operations for Aurizon, Matt Jones, said his company's business case was based on the current grain market but it welcomed any other company's freight on the railway. Rowan Ramsey, the member for the federal Division of Grey, said that while he would love to see more freight off the roads, there would need to be "a substantial business case for the rebuild of the rail line to be successful. The suggestion here is that the taxpayer stump up $220 million for one of the wealthiest companies in the world [Viterra] to build an asset only they would use. ... they were the last customer of that railway and pulled their trade maybe four years ago, ... now they want to rebuild it with taxpayers' funds for only them to use because Viterra is the only customer on that line." However, a founder of the March for Eyre group, Marie Shaw, said claims that Viterra was using taxpayers' money after they "pulled their trade" was incorrect. "What Viterra and Aurizon have done is [to say they] will together work to reopen the rail – which is actually a state government responsibility, ultimately – by [applying to] the federal government for the kind of input that the other states are getting towards regional rail. Viterra does not have any commercial arrangement with that rail, or any responsibility at all."

== Lines ==
Lines
From	To	Distance (kilometres)	Notes
Port Lincoln	Thevenard	434	Opened to Cummins 18 November 1907, Yeelanna 1 April 1909, Minnipa 5 May 1913, Nunjikompita 14 August 1914, Thevenard 8 February 1915
Cummins	Buckleboo	213	Opened to Moody 1 August 1912, to Ungarra 31 March 1913, Kimba 11 July 1913, Buckleboo 5 August 1926, last train beyond Kimba ran in March 2005
Yeelanna	Mount Hope	38	Opened 9 October 1914, cut back to Kapinnie 12 July 1965, remainder closed October 2002 Last known through vehicles were operated by ASSCO
Wandana	Penong	83	Opened 7 February 1924, Wandana to Kowulka closed 13 February 1966, Kowulka to Penong closed 3 March 1997 Last Lessor ASSCO January 2003
Penong Junction	Kowulka	69	Kevin to Kowulka opened 11 April 1950, Penong Junction to Kevin opened 13 February 1966

== Services ==
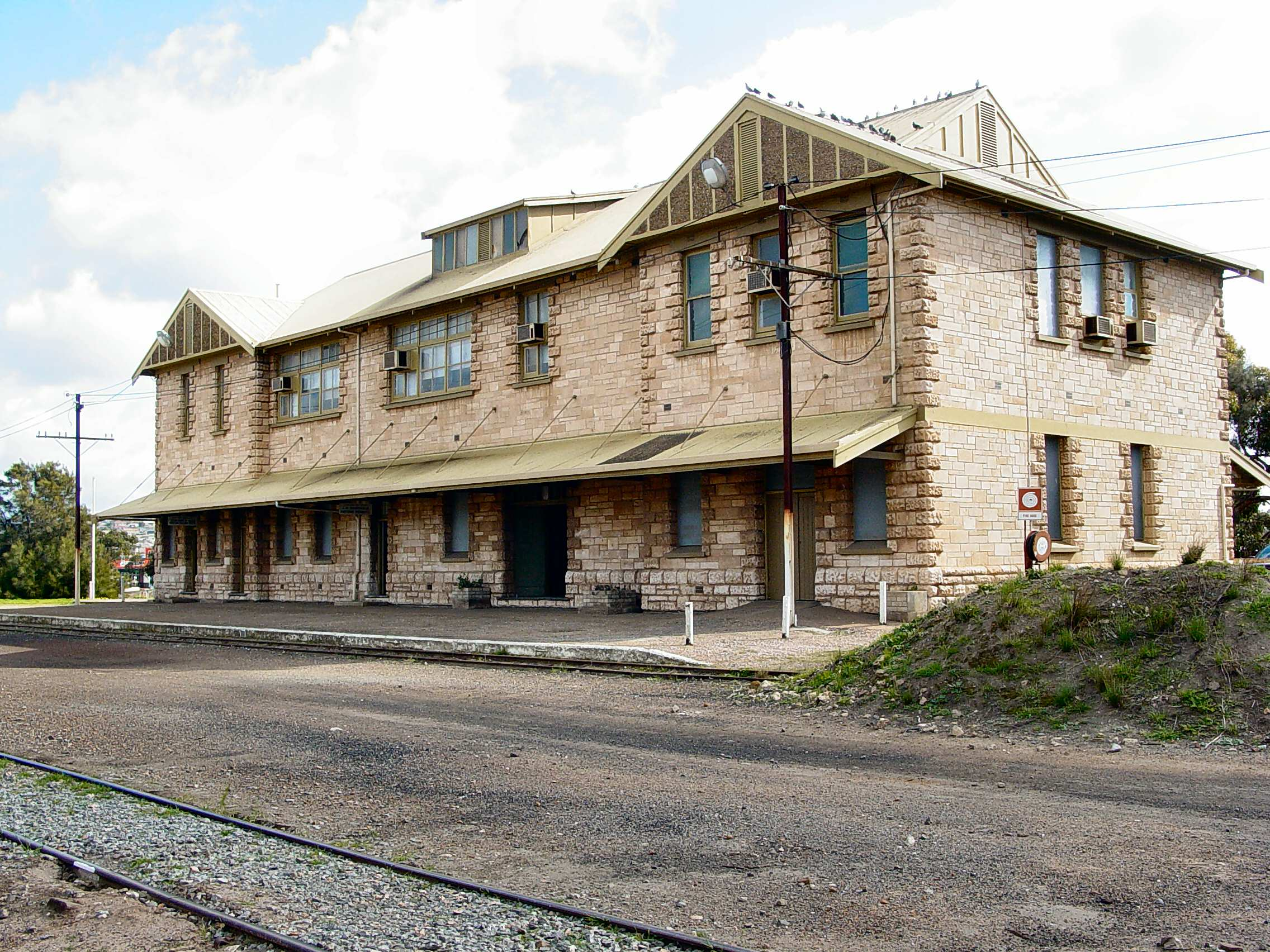
Port Lincoln railway station

=== Freight ===
Since June 2019, the Eyre Peninsula Railway only carries gypsum traffic with three returns services running daily. In 2017, 1.55 million tonnes of gypsum was transported. Until 2019, grain traffic was dominant on the division since the 1970's. Previously livestock, oil, salt, superphosphate and water was carried on both dedicated freight and mixed trains.

=== Passenger ===
Initially passengers were conveyed on mixed trains. A weekly passenger service from Port Lincoln to Thevenard was introduced in 1923 that included a sleeping car. It operated as a boat train being positioned at the foot of the jetty at Port Lincoln to connect with ships from Adelaide. In 1931 Fageol railbuses converted from motor buses were introduced, these were supplemented by Brill 75s in 1936. The last service was withdrawn on 30 August 1968, though passengers could still travel on freight services by prior arrangement.

== Motive power and rolling stock ==
The Eyre Peninsula Railway was initially operated by T, V, W and Y class steam locomotives. All had previously been used on other parts of the SAR network. These were replaced by 830 class diesel locomotives in the 1960s, some of which have never left the division. Nine were delivered new to the Eyre Peninsula Railway, while others were transferred from the Port Pirie to Broken Hill line after it was converted to standard gauge replacing the last remaining T class steam locomotives in April 1970.

Some 830s were transferred to AN Tasrail in the early 1980s and replaced by ex Commonwealth Railways NT and NJ class locomotives made redundant by the closure of the Central Australia Railway, the use of the NT class locomotives was not successful and both were cut up at Port Lincoln. In January 2019 the locomotive fleet comprised seven 830s (including three rebuilt as 900s), three NJs and two ex Australian Railroad Group A locomotives classified as the 1200 class. As of January 2023, the Thevenard based locomotive fleet is worked by two NJs, the two 1200s and a handful of operational 830/900 class units.

Rolling stock was maintained under contract by Clyde Engineering and Downer Rail from 1997 until brought back in house in 2014. The infrastructure was maintained by Broadspectrum.

== Depots ==
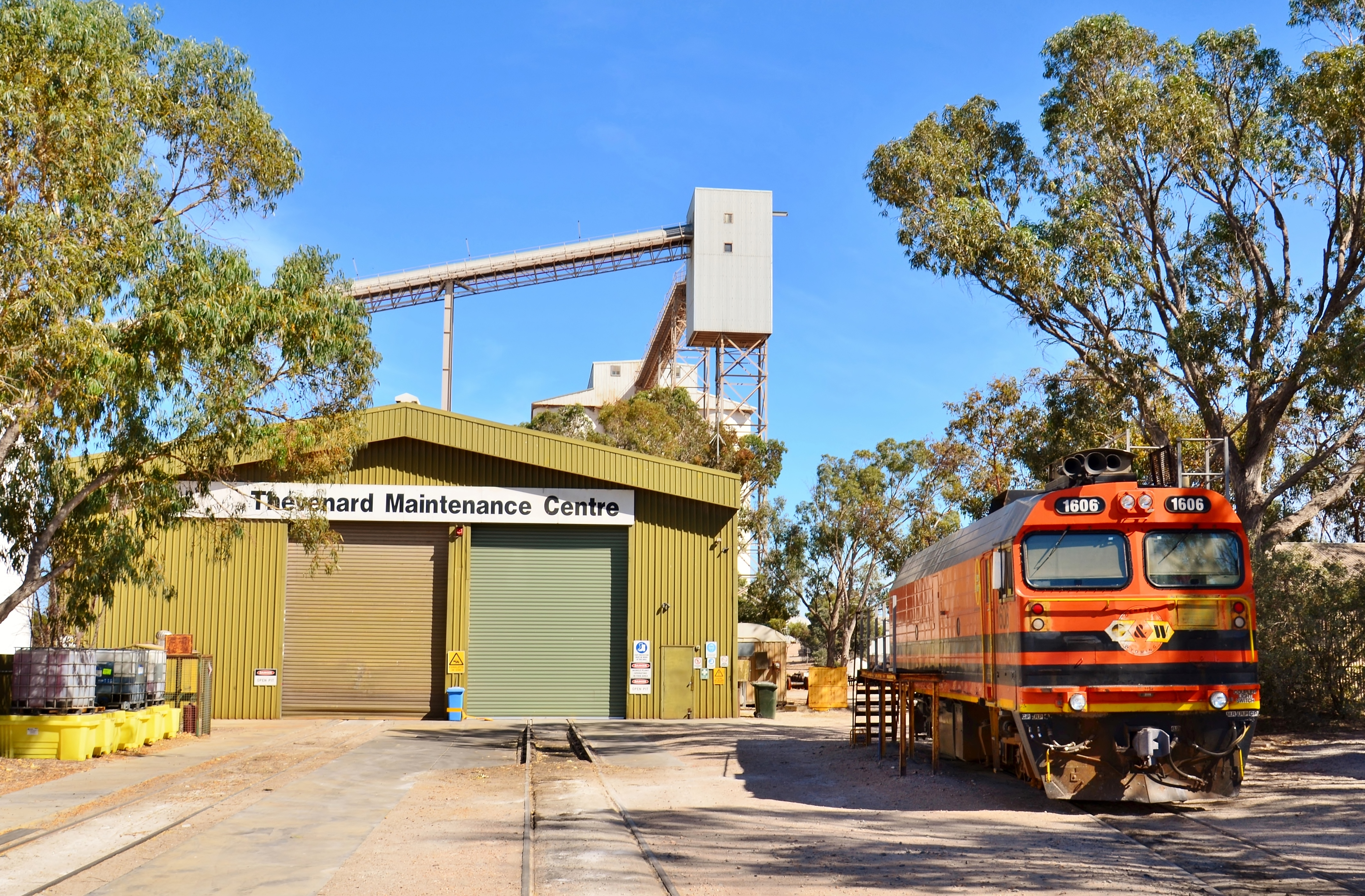
1606 at Thevenard depot in April 2017

When the line opened, a depot was established at Cummins with locomotives sent to Islington Railway Workshops in Adelaide for major work. From 1931 the railway was able to handle all level of repairs with the establishment of a workshop at Port Lincoln with a roundhouse opened in 1934. The workshop was rebuilt in 1966 to service diesel locomotives.

As well as maintaining the Eyre Peninsula fleet, in later years Downer Rail used the Port Lincoln depot for external work including rebuilding five Queensland Rail 2100s for further use with Australian Railroad Group, and 830s, CKs and DAs for the Whyalla Steelworks network. In 2019, the locomotive depot was nominated for inclusion on the South Australian Heritage Register. As of December 2019, the locomotive workshops and roundhouse have been provisionally listed on the register.

A locomotive shed was also established at Thevenard and replaced by a small locomotive servicing facility in 1992. With the closure of the grain network, the Thevenard facility was expected to be upgraded when the Port Lincoln depot closed. As of December 2019, the Port Lincoln Workshops remained open for re-skinning wagon interiors brought in by road from the nearby BHP Whyalla Tramway.

== See also ==
- Railway stations on the Eyre Peninsula
