= Eastern Eyre Football League =

- Sport: Australian rules football
- Founded: 1989; 37 years ago
- Country: Australia
- Confederation: SANFL

The Eastern Eyre Football League (EEFL) is an Australian rules football competition based in the Eyre Peninsula region of South Australia. It was formed in 1989 from the merger of the Kimba Districts Football League and the County Jervois Football League. The league's foundation clubs were Cleve, Cowell, Darke Peak-Waddikee (a merger of Darke Peak & Waddikee), Kimba Districts (a merger of Kimba, Buckleboo & Kelly), Ports (a merger of Arno Bay & Port Neill) and Rudall.

Central Eyre and Wudinna United amalgamated to form Central Eyre United and transferred from the Mid West League before the start of 2021.

It is an affiliated member of the South Australian National Football League.

== Clubs ==
=== Locations ===
Locations of the Eastern Eyre FL clubs

=== Current ===
Club	Colours	Nickname	Home Ground	Former League	Est.	Years in EEFL	EEFL Senior Premierships	
Club	Colours	Nickname	Home Ground	Former League	Est.	Years in EEFL	Total	Years
Central Eyre United		Storm	Wudinna Oval, Wudinna; Kyancutta Oval, Kyancutta and Warramboo Oval, Warramboo	–	2021	2021-	1	2024
Cowell		Cats	Cowell Oval, Cowell	CJFL	1963	1989-	5	1996, 1999, 2006, 2007, 2009
Eastern Ranges		Rangers	Cleve Oval, Cleve and Rudall Oval, Rudall	–	2012	2012-	4	2012, 2013, 2015, 2026
Kimba Districts		Tigers	Kimba Recreation Reserve, Kimba	–	1989	1989-	14	1989, 1990, 1993, 1995, 2002, 2003, 2008, 2010, 2011, 2014, 2016, 2018, 2019, 2025
Ports		Magpies	Arno Football Oval, Arno Bay and Port Neill Sporting Complex, Port Neill	–	1989	1989-	4	2017, 2021, 2022, 2023

=== Former ===
Club	Colours	Nickname	Home Ground	Former League	Est.	Years in league	EEFL Senior Premierships		Fate
Club	Colours	Nickname	Home Ground	Former League	Est.	Years in league	Total	Years	Fate
Cleve		Bombers	Cleve Oval, Cleve	CJFL	1908	1989–2011	8	1992, 1994, 1997, 1998, 2000, 2001, 2004, 2005	Merged with Rudall to form Eastern Ranges in 2012
Darke Peak-Waddikee		Blues	Darke Peak Sporting Complex, Darke Peak	–	1989	1989–1996	1	1991	Folded in 1996
Rudall	(1989-?)(1990s)(?-2011)	Rams	Rudall Oval, Rudall	CJFL	1927	1989–2011	0	–	Merged with Cleve to form Eastern Ranges in 2012

== 2009 Ladder ==
Eastern Eyre	Wins	Byes	Losses	Draws	For	Against	%	Pts
Kimba Districts	10	0	2	0	1090	751	59.21%	20
Cowell	9	0	3	0	1480	809	64.66%	18
Cleve	8	0	4	0	1228	892	57.92%	16
Rudall	3	0	9	0	832	1081	43.49%	6
Ports	0	0	12	0	642	1739	26.96%	0

Finals

Final	Team	G	B	Pts	Team	G	B	Pts
1st Semi	Cleve	12	10	82	Rudall	10	12	72
2nd Semi	Cowell	10	13	73	Kimba Districts	7	8	50
Preliminary	Kimba Districts	13	15	93	Cleve	9	7	61
Grand	Cowell	13	11	89	Kimba Districts	11	7	73

== 2010 Ladder ==
Eastern Eyre	Wins	Byes	Losses	Draws	For	Against	%	Pts	Final	Team	G	B	Pts	Team	G	B	Pts
Kimba Districts	12	0	0	0	1427	620	69.71%	24	1st Semi	Cleve	13	6	84	Ports	13	4	82
Cowell	6	0	6	0	1106	948	53.85%	12	2nd Semi	Kimba Districts	18	13	121	Cowell	14	14	98
Cleve	6	0	6	0	880	1004	46.71%	12	Preliminary	Cowell	5	26	56	Cleve	6	1	37
Ports	4	0	8	0	915	1122	44.92%	8	Grand	Kimba Districts	9	5	59	Cleve	9	3	57
Rudall	2	0	10	0	648	1282	33.58%	4									

== 2011 Ladder ==
Eastern Eyre	Wins	Byes	Losses	Draws	For	Against	%	Pts	Final	Team	G	B	Pts	Team	G	B	Pts
Kimba Districts	12	0	0	0	1834	490	78.92%	24	1st Semi	Cowell	20	10	130	Rudall	9	8	62
Ports	7	0	5	0	1085	1077	50.19%	14	2nd Semi	Kimba Districts	25	12	162	Ports	8	4	52
Cowell	6	0	6	0	1266	1004	55.77%	12	Preliminary	Cowell	8	17	65	Ports	8	11	59
Rudall	4	0	8	0	914	1358	40.23%	8	Grand	Kimba Districts	10	17	77	Cowell	10	7	67
Cleve	1	0	11	0	602	1772	25.36%	2									

== 2012 Ladder ==
Eastern Eyre	Wins	Byes	Losses	Draws	For	Against	%	Pts	Final	Team	G	B	Pts	Team	G	B	Pts
Kimba Districts	12	0	3	0	1599	789	66.96%	24	1st Semi	Ports	15	12	102	Cowell	6	6	42
Eastern Ranges	11	0	4	0	1827	847	68.32%	22	2nd Semi	Eastern Ranges	13	10	88	Kimba Districts	10	10	70
Ports	7	0	8	0	1108	1064	51.01%	14	Preliminary	Kimba Districts	14	6	90	Ports	9	7	61
Cowell	0	0	15	0	500	2334	17.64%	0	Grand	Eastern Ranges	16	12	108	Kimba Districts	14	6	90

== 2013 Ladder ==
Eastern Eyre	Wins	Byes	Losses	Draws	For	Against	%	Pts	Final	Team	G	B	Pts	Team	G	B	Pts
Kimba Districts	10	0	2	0	1349	675	66.65%	20	1st Semi	Ports	13	6	84	Cowell	9	13	67
Eastern Ranges	9	0	3	0	1103	683	61.76%	18	2nd Semi	Kimba Districts	11	10	76	Eastern Ranges	9	10	64
Cowell	3	0	9	0	741	1171	38.76%	6	Preliminary	Eastern Ranges	13	20	98	Ports	11	8	74
Ports	2	0	10	0	597	1261	32.13%	4	Grand	Eastern Ranges	13	9	87	Kimba Districts	8	11	59

== 2014 Ladder ==
Eastern Eyre	Wins	Byes	Losses	Draws	For	Against	%	Pts	Final	Team	G	B	Pts	Team	G	B	Pts
Kimba Districts	11	0	2	0	1737	606	74.14%	22	1st Semi	Ports	25	16	166	Cowell	2	9	21
Eastern Ranges	10	0	3	0	1590	616	72.08%	20	2nd Semi	Kimba Districts	10	8	68	Eastern Ranges	13	9	87
Ports	5	0	8	0	815	1425	36.38%	10	Preliminary	Kimba Districts	25	18	168	Ports	4	6	30
Cowell	0	0	13	0	416	1911	17.88%	0	Grand	Kimba Districts	13	7	85	Eastern Ranges	10	12	72

== 2015 Ladder ==
Eastern Eyre	Wins	Byes	Losses	Draws	For	Against	%	Pts	Final	Team	G	B	Pts	Team	G	B	Pts
Eastern Ranges	11	0	0	1	1525	552	73.42%	23	1st Semi	Cowell	10	5	65	Ports	8	12	60
Kimba Districts	8	0	4	0	1103	733	60.08%	16	2nd Semi	Kimba Districts	15	6	96	Eastern Ranges	13	13	91
Ports	2	0	9	1	909	1163	43.87%	5	Preliminary	Eastern Ranges	30	19	199	Cowell	5	8	38
Cowell	2	0	10	0	449	1538	22.60%	4	Grand	Eastern Ranges	13	14	92	Kimba Districts	9	10	64

== 2016 Ladder ==
Eastern Eyre	Wins	Byes	Losses	Draws	For	Against	%	Pts	Final	Team	G	B	Pts	Team	G	B	Pts
Kimba Districts	12	0	0	0	1549	534	74.36%	24	1st Semi	Cowell	13	13	91	Ports	7	5	47
Eastern Ranges	6	0	6	0	1058	898	54.09%	12	2nd Semi	Kimba Districts	23	7	145	Eastern Ranges	9	11	65
Cowell	3	0	8	1	750	1355	35.63%	7	Preliminary	Eastern Ranges	14	13	97	Cowell	12	3	75
Ports	2	0	9	1	631	1201	34.44%	5	Grand	Kimba Districts	14	13	97	Eastern Ranges	8	7	55

== 2017 Ladder ==
Eastern Eyre	Wins	Byes	Losses	Draws	For	Against	%	Pts	Final	Team	G	B	Pts	Team	G	B	Pts
Kimba Districts	8	0	4	0	1051	780	57.40%	16	1st Semi	Ports	12	8	80	Cowell	10	9	69
Eastern Ranges	8	0	4	0	917	818	52.85%	16	2nd Semi	Kimba Districts	10	7	67	Eastern Ranges	5	8	38
Ports	6	0	6	0	866	908	48.82%	12	Preliminary	Ports	17	13	115	Eastern Ranges	10	5	65
Cowell	2	0	10	0	767	1095	41.19%	4	Grand	Ports	10	11	71	Kimba Districts	9	8	62

== 2018 Ladder ==
Eastern Eyre	Wins	Byes	Losses	Draws	For	Against	%	Pts	Final	Team	G	B	Pts	Team	G	B	Pts
Kimba Districts	9	0	3	0	1123	553	67.00%	18	1st Semi	Cowell	14	11	95	Ports	4	3	27
Eastern Ranges	9	0	3	0	1158	629	64.80%	18	2nd Semi	Eastern Ranges	15	15	105	Kimba Districts	14	15	99
Cowell	6	0	6	0	903	906	49.92%	12	Preliminary	Kimba Districts	14	10	94	Cowell	7	7	49
Ports	0	0	12	0	347	1443	19.39%	0	Grand	Kimba Districts	14	11	95	Eastern Ranges	4	11	35

== 2019 Ladder ==
Eastern Eyre	Wins	Byes	Losses	Draws	For	Against	%	Pts	Final	Team	G	B	Pts	Team	G	B	Pts
Kimba Districts	11	0	1	0	1600	542	74.70%	22	1st Semi	Ports	14	9	93	Cowell	8	10	58
Eastern Ranges	9	0	3	0	1362	629	68.41%	18	2nd Semi	Kimba Districts	16	10	106	Eastern Ranges	9	5	59
Ports	3	0	9	0	737	1219	37.68%	6	Preliminary	Eastern Ranges	14	19	103	Ports	11	11	77
Cowell	1	0	11	0	440	1749	20.10%	2	Grand	Kimba Districts	16	9	105	Eastern Ranges	8	6	54

== 2020 Ladder ==
No competition due to Co-vid pandemic

== 2021 Ladder ==
Eastern Eyre	Wins	Byes	Losses	Draws	For	Against	%	Pts	Final	Team	G	B	Pts	Team	G	B	Pts
Eastern Ranges	9	0	1	2	810	461	63.73%	20	1st Semi	Ports	11	10	76	Central Eyre United	10	9	69
Kimba Districts	9	0	2	1	1010	478	67.88%	19	2nd Semi	Kimba Districts	9	12	66	Eastern Ranges	7	6	48
Ports	6	0	4	2	800	726	52.42%	14	Preliminary	Ports	12	8	80	Eastern Ranges	8	15	63
Central Eyre United	2	0	9	1	664	1005	39.78%	5	Grand	Ports	8	8	56	Kimba Districts	8	7	55
Cowell	0	0	10	2	442	1056	29.51%	2									

== 2022 Ladder ==
Eastern Eyre	Wins	Byes	Losses	Draws	For	Against	%	Pts	Final	Team	G	B	Pts	Team	G	B	Pts
Ports	11	0	1	0	1329	478	73.55%	22	1st Semi	Central Eyre United	14	12	96	Kimba Districts	6	9	45
Eastern Ranges	8	0	4	0	1120	570	66.27%	16	2nd Semi	Ports	10	12	72	Eastern Ranges	9	9	63
Central Eyre United	7	0	5	0	1017	646	61.15%	14	Preliminary	Eastern Ranges	9	9	63	Central Eyre United	7	12	54
Kimba Districts	4	0	8	0	699	1016	40.76%	8	Grand	Ports	10	13	73	Eastern Ranges	11	4	70
Cowell	0	0	12	0	304	1759	14.74%	0									

== 2023 Ladder ==
Eastern Eyre	Wins	Byes	Losses	Draws	For	Against	%	Pts	Final	Team	G	B	Pts	Team	G	B	Pts
Eastern Ranges	11	0	1	0	1082	510	67.96%	22	1st Semi	Central Eyre United	12	12	84	Kimba Districts	3	5	23
Ports	9	0	3	0	1141	657	63.46%	18	2nd Semi	Ports	7	4	46	Eastern Ranges	13	15	93
Central Eyre United	7	0	5	0	1043	664	61.10%	14	Preliminary	Ports	13	9	87	Central Eyre United	9	10	64
Kimba Districts	3	0	9	0	533	947	36.01%	6	Grand	Ports	9	9	63	Eastern Ranges	6	17	53
Cowell	0	0	12	0	345	1366	20.16%	0									

== Notable players ==
Notable AFL players to have played in the league include Corey Enright (Kimba Districts), Shaun Rehn (Ports), Shane and Darryl Wakelin (Kimba Districts), Brett Chalmers (Rudall), Levi Greenwood (Ports).

Notable coaches include Grant "Puggy" Jenner (Cleve), Ivan "Shorty" Shubert (Darke Peak, Cleve) and Ben "The Hampster" Hampel (Rudall).

Notable personalities of the league include Brian Rhett "Boozer" Morrow of Darke Peak.

== Books ==
- Encyclopedia of South Australian country football clubs, compiled by Peter Lines. ISBN 9780980447293
- South Australian country football digest, by Peter Lines ISBN 9780987159199
