= Kapinnie, South Australia =

Coordinates: 34°08′16″S 135°29′52″E

Kapinnie is a locality on Eyre Peninsula in South Australia, 25 km west of Cummins and 41 m above sea level, and is located on the Mount Hope railway line.

The 2021 Australian census reports that Kapinnie had a population of 42 people.
