= Whidbey =

Whidbey can refer to:

- Joseph Whidbey - a member of the Royal Navy who served on the Vancouver Expedition
- Whidbey, the Microsoft pre-release codename for Visual Studio 2005, as a reference to the island in the United States
- Whidbey Telecom (Formerly Whidbey Telephone Company) a Telecommunications company operating on the south end of Whidbey Island and Point Roberts, Washington
- USS Whidbey Island (LSD-41), a US Navy dock landing ship

== Places ==
All named after Joseph Whidbey:

- Point Whidbey, headland in South Australia
- Whidbey Isles, an island group in South Australia
  - Whidbey Isles Conservation Park, protected area associated with the South Australian island group
- Whidbey Island, Washington, United States
- Whidbey Reach, a segment of the Gardner Canal, British Columbia, Canada

== See also ==
- Whitby (disambiguation)
