= Coffin Bay pony =

Breed of horse

Coffin Bay Pony
- Country of origin: Australia

The Coffin Bay Pony is a semi-feral horse that developed in Australia. These ponies evolved from foundation bloodstock of 60 Timor Ponies that were imported by English settlers from Indonesia to Coffin Bay, on the southern tip of the Eyre Peninsula at Coffin Bay, South Australia. Coffin Bay Ponies are often confused with Australia's most noted feral horses, the Brumby, which lives in wild mobs all over Australia. However, Coffin Bay ponies live in a fenced protected area.

== Characteristics ==
Coffin Bay ponies have always been reared in a semi-wild and wild manner, which has made them healthy and hardy with strong bones and hooves. Ponies have a conformation which is very reminiscent of a Timor pony with good hindquarters and short legs. They have a kind and intelligent eye. There are two acceptable types of Coffin Bay ponies, the lighter saddle type and a slightly stronger type with clean legs, for both driving and riding.

Domesticated ponies have a very manageable and friendly temperament that is suitable for children and small adults. Even feral ponies also possess a friendly, intelligent temperament.

Coffin Bay ponies can vary in height but they are not above 14.2 hands (58 inches, 147 cm). They are mainly bay, brown, black, chestnut, grey, red and blue roan and dun, but all solid colours are permissible. Broken colours such as pinto testify to the presence of other bloodlines and are therefore not permitted. White markings on the legs or face are acceptable.

== History ==
In 1839, the settler and British Captain Hawson and his family arrived in Happy Valley in South Australia to live and breed horses. With him came the 60 Timor Ponies which Captain Hawson had purchased from the Rajah of Sumatra in Indonesia. These ponies would be the basis of Hawson’s newly established stud farm to breed ponies that were well suited for the hot climate.

The shipping company V. & E. Solomon imported to South Australia, around the same time, 50 Timor Ponies. It is possible this refers to the same consignment.

Hawson's company expanded and the Timor ponies were moved to his new lease at the Coffin Bay Run in 1847. Here they were bred in a semi-wild, yet controlled manner in the new stud, Coffin Bay Run. In 1857 Coffin Bay Run was sold to W. R. Mortlock who instead of investing in the pure Timor ponies, imported larger horses and ponies, which he crossed with the semi-wild Timor ponies to produce larger stock. Mortlock used approved stallions of the Welsh Cob, Thoroughbred and Arabian Horse breeds in the herd. He also used Clydesdale and Hackney horses who may have had influence on the Coffin Bay Ponies.

Mortlock used a selective breeding plan and culled unwanted ponies which were sold. During the early 1860s, the ponies were very popular and often sold in pairs and matching teams to be used for driving, while others were sold and used for polo and as cavalry horses.

In 1927 Mortlock's descendants sold the Coffin Bay Run to Martin Cash. Before the sale, the management of the farm and horse herd had been neglected, as it was no longer commercially viable to breed horses. Ponies became untamed and wild, growing rapidly in number and causing major problems for the farm's new owner. Many of the ponies were culled or shot in order to reduce their numbers.

The Morgan family purchased the Coffin Bay Run in 1932. This family immediately saw potential for these ponies and sold them instead of shooting them. Ponies became popular again when the depression led to petrol and diesel becoming rationed and very expensive. Tractors, which once had replaced horses for field work on the farms, were now too expensive to use, making ponies and horses indispensable. The Morgan family therefore mustered a small portion of the herd a few times during the year and sold them at markets in Port Augusta.

After World War II finished, however, demand for ponies declined as the economy stabilized and the mechanization of society made equine work animals obsolete. Moss Morgan, who owned the farm during this time, developed a new use for Coffin Bay Ponies, which he had mustered, trained to ride, and then sold as riding ponies.

In 1972, the farm was taken over by Stan Morgan. In an attempt to save the herd, he gave the farm to the South Australia Government to transform the land into a national park. Ponies could still live in the park and were there when the Coffin Bay Peninsula was formally declared a National Park in 1982. They were then regarded as feral animals on land being managed for the preservation of native species. The National Parks and Wildlife Service (NPWS) then launched a program to eliminate the ponies from the peninsula. Concerned locals banded together to form the non-profit Coffin Bay Pony Society, a volunteer group dedicated to keeping the ponies in the Park. This group would work out a compromise in order to permit the horses to stay if they were managed under more controlled conditions.

Ponies had caused damage on land within the national park but it was agreed that the breed had a historical value. In 1991 the first Management Agreement was entered into between the Coffin Bay Pony Society and the National Parks and Wildlife Service. It allowed then a much smaller herd, or "mob," consisting of twenty mares, one stallion, and their foals, to live in the park. To avoid the mobs growing in numbers, the ponies were mustered once a year, to be handled and then auctioned. A predetermined price per head went to the NPWS for land management and the rest of the money was used by the Coffin Bay Pony Society.

In 1999 the National Parks and Wildlife Service devised a new Draft Management Plan for the area that included the proposal of a Wilderness Zone that would take the ponies away from their natural pastures. After failing to consult with the Office of Environment and Heritage, the Government ordered that the herd should be moved. Following the public outcry that ensued in 2003, the State Government was forced to compromise. Instead of being eliminated, the ponies were relocated to a special parcel of nearby land purchased equally by the Pony Preservation Society and the State Government for A$200,000.

On 29 February 2004, the final mob of 35 or 40 ponies were moved to their new home, ironically called the "Brumbies Run", near Coffin Bay. The ponies are now living there with minimal contact from people, but may be viewed in a vehicle by arrangement with the preservation society. Once a year they are mustered, handled, and auctioned.

== See also ==
- Australian Pony
- Brumby
- Feral horses
- Timor Pony
