= V. & E. Solomon =

V. & E. Solomon was from 1837 to 1844 an Australian firm of auctioneers in Sydney, and shipping agents operating between Sydney and Adelaide. Its principals were Vaiben Solomon (c. 1800–1860) and his brother Emanuel Solomon (1800–1873), who were transported to Australia for theft, and after gaining their freedom and considerable wealth through business acumen, brought out to Australia other members of their family, creating a dynasty prominent in business and politics.

They were agents for the Brig Dorset, Captain David Walsh, owner Charles Smith, from 1839 to 1842, and was subsequently either owned by them or reserved for their personal and private business use from 1843, to at least 1847. Dorset had superior cabin accommodation, more suited to a yacht. Her captain, who died in Adelaide in 1851 aged 44, was also highly regarded.

They purchased the recently built barque Strathisla in 1839. Her first cargo was 99 ponies from Timor of which 50 were for Adelaide and the remainder for Melbourne, yielding a tidy profit. Around the same time, one Captain Hawson imported, to South Australia, 60 ponies that became the noted Coffin Bay breed. From 1844, she was no longer on their books.

They employed, as supercargo, a nephew Judah Moss Solomon (1818–1880), who eventually teamed up with their brother Isaac Solomon (1816/18–1901).

The partnership was dissolved in April 1844.
