= Whitby (disambiguation) =

Whitby is a seaside town, fishing port and tourist destination in North Yorkshire on the north-east coast of England.

Whitby may also refer to:

== Places ==
- Whitby (constituency), a former constituency in North Yorkshire, England
- Whitby, Cheshire, suburb of Ellesmere Port, England
- Whitby, New Zealand, suburb of Porirua
- Whitby, Ontario, town in Canada
  - Whitby (federal electoral district), one of the 338 ridings in the House of Commons
  - Whitby (provincial electoral district), a riding that elects a member of the Legislative Assembly of Ontario
  - Whitby GO Station, transit station in Whitby, Ontario
  - Whitby Rail Maintenance Facility, a GO Transit rail facility
- Whitby, West Virginia, American coal mining village
- Whitby, Western Australia, suburb of Perth
- Whitby Abbey, Benedictine abbey ruin in Whitby, Yorkshire
- The Whitby, apartment building in New York City

== Sports ==
- Whitby Dunlops, name of several Canadian hockey clubs
- Whitby Fury, Canadian hockey club
- Whitby Lawmen, Canadian hockey club
- Whitby Town F.C., English football club
- Whitby Warriors, Canadian box lacrosse team

== People ==
- Whitby (surname)
- Ælfflæd of Whitby (654–713), English Christian saint
- Hilda of Whitby (c. 614–680), English Christian saint
- Whitby Hertford (born 1978), American voice actor

== Other uses ==
- Whitby-class frigate, class of six Royal Navy ships
  - HMS Whitby, the name of two ships of the Royal Navy
- HMCS Whitby, the name of a Royal Canadian Navy frigate
- Bishop of Whitby, Church of England clerical office
- Synod of Whitby (664), Christian church conference in England
- Whitby (barque), was one of the first New Zealand Company ships bringing settlers and supplies Nelson, New Zealand
- Port of Whitby, port in North Yorkshire, England

== See also ==
- Prospect of Whitby, a London pub
- The Whitby Witches, fantasy novel series by Robin Jarvis
- Whidbey (disambiguation)
