= Coffin Bay National Park =

National park in Australia

- IUCN category II (national park)
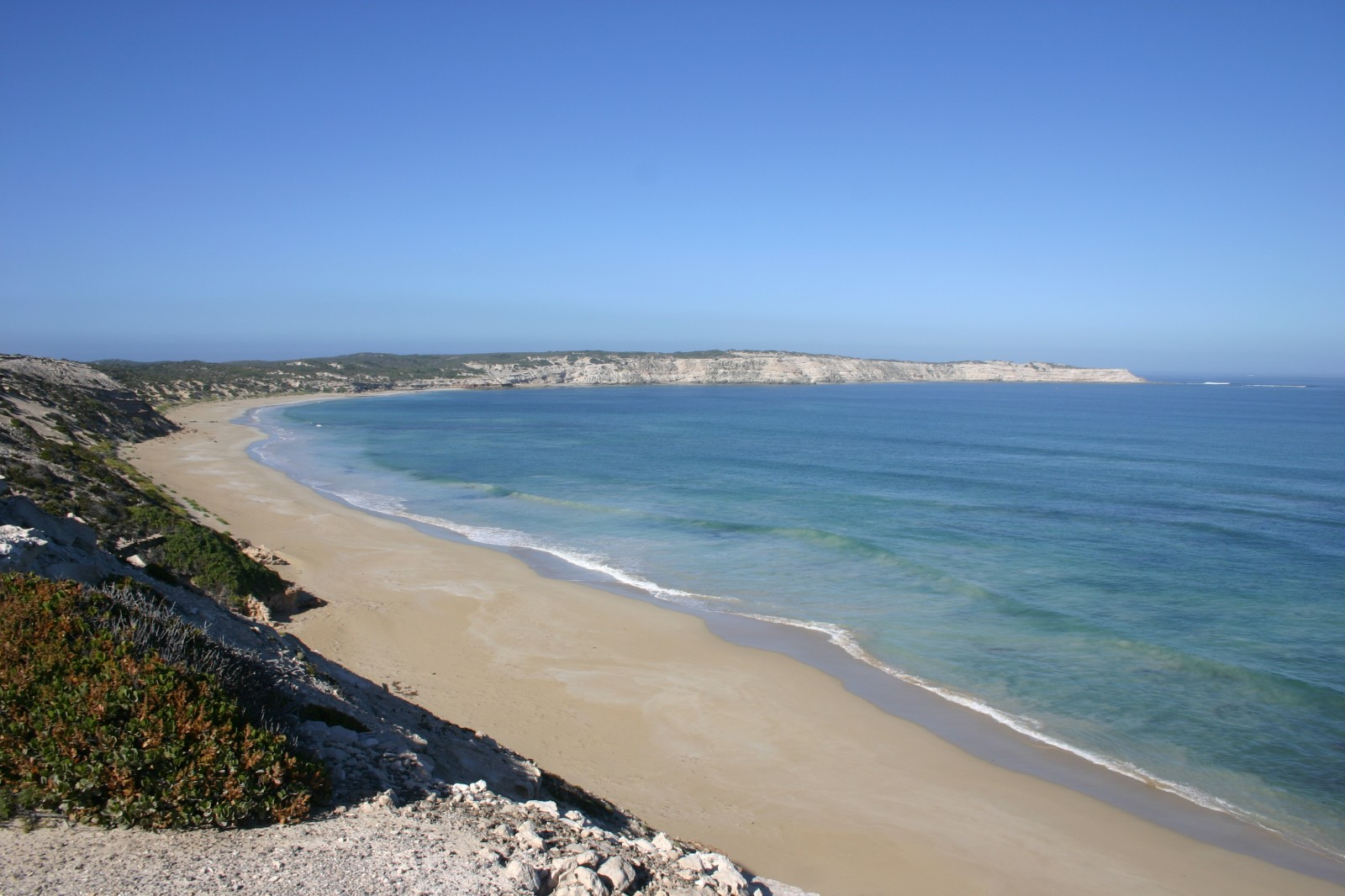
- Avoid Bay, on the national park's west coast

- Location within South Australia
- Location: South Australia
- Nearest city: Coffin Bay
- Coordinates: 34°40′25″S 135°25′48″E
- Area: 309.76 km^{2} (119.60 sq mi)
- Established: 2 December 1982
- Governing body: Department for Environment and Water
- Website: http://www.environment.sa.gov.au/parks/Find_a_Park/Browse_by_region/Eyre_Peninsula/Coffin_Bay_National_Park

Coffin Bay National Park is a protected area in on the Eyre Peninsula of South Australia, Australia, which is located about 301 km west of Adelaide and about 46 km west of Port Lincoln. The town of Coffin Bay is near the entrance to the national park. The national park occupies the Coffin Bay Peninsula – a long peninsula with a sheltered bay to its north, coastal dunes, swamps and a coastline which overlooks islands, reefs, limestone cliffs and white surf beaches.

To the east of Point Avoid are Almonta and Gunyah Beaches, used for surfing. Reefs extend out to sea from Point Avoid to Golden Island with Price Island further out. There is a camping area at Yangie Bay with camping fees payable on entry to the National Park. Access to the majority of the park's area north of Yangie Bay is via four wheel drive tracks only.

The historic former Coffin Bay Whaling Site at Point Sir Isaac lies within the national park and is listed on the South Australian Heritage Register.

== Wildlife ==
There is a great variety of wildlife in the national park. Many seabirds can be seen including white-bellied sea eagles and ospreys as well as various albatrosses and petrels.

The volunteer organisation Friends of Coffin Bay Parks have worked to re-introduce native plants and eradicate feral animals and weeds.

== Associated protected areas ==
=== Statutory ===
The waters adjoining the coastline of the national park are within the Thorny Passage Marine Park.

=== Non-statutory arrangements ===
The area covered by the national park is also overlapped by the Coffin Bay Important Bird Area, a non-statutory classification determined by BirdLife International. This particular IBA supports over 1% of the world populations of pied and sooty oystercatchers, as well as significant numbers of fairy terns, hooded plovers, western whipbirds, rock parrots and blue-breasted fairy-wrens.

== Gallery ==
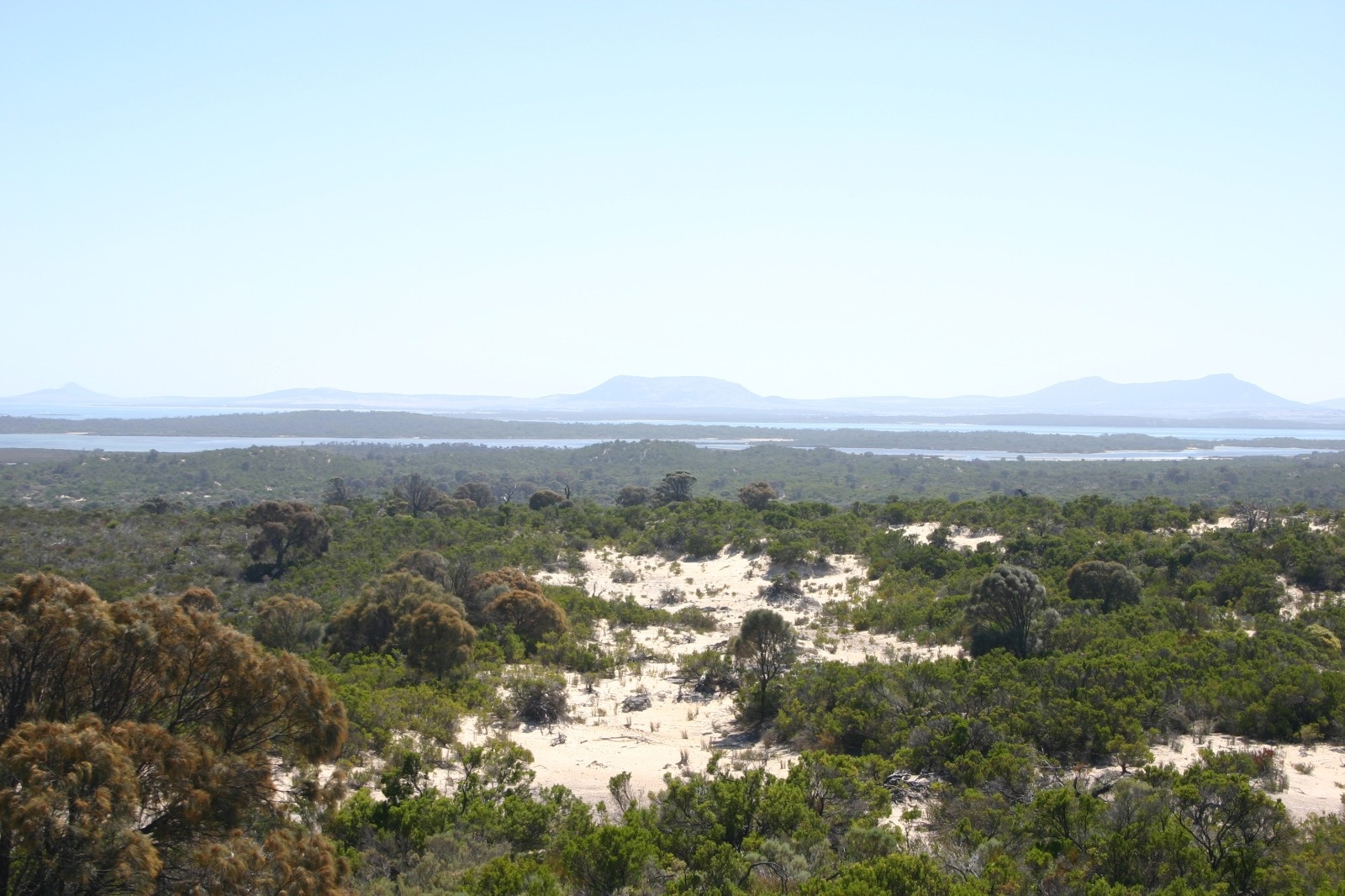
View over coastal heath

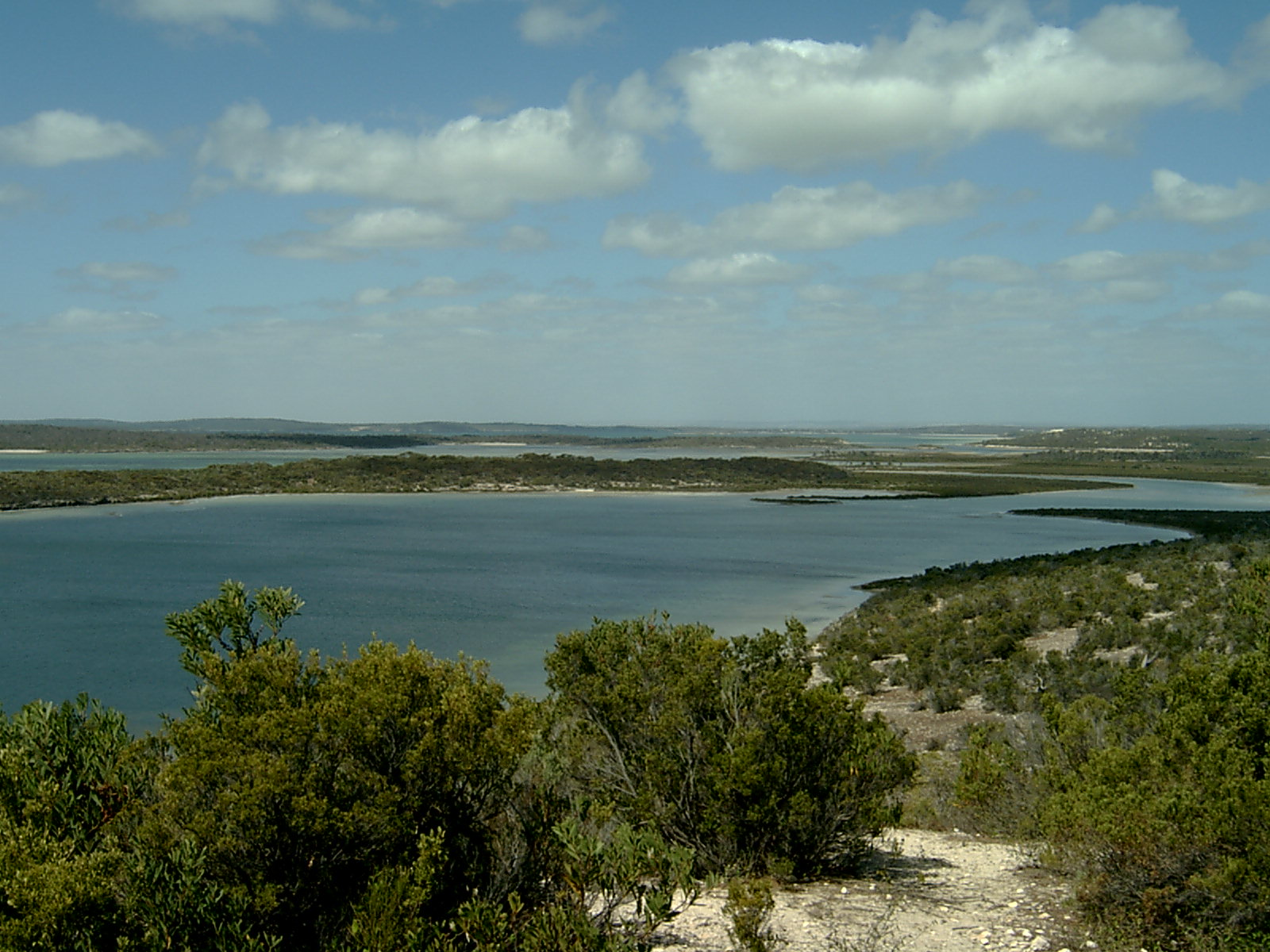
Yangie Bay

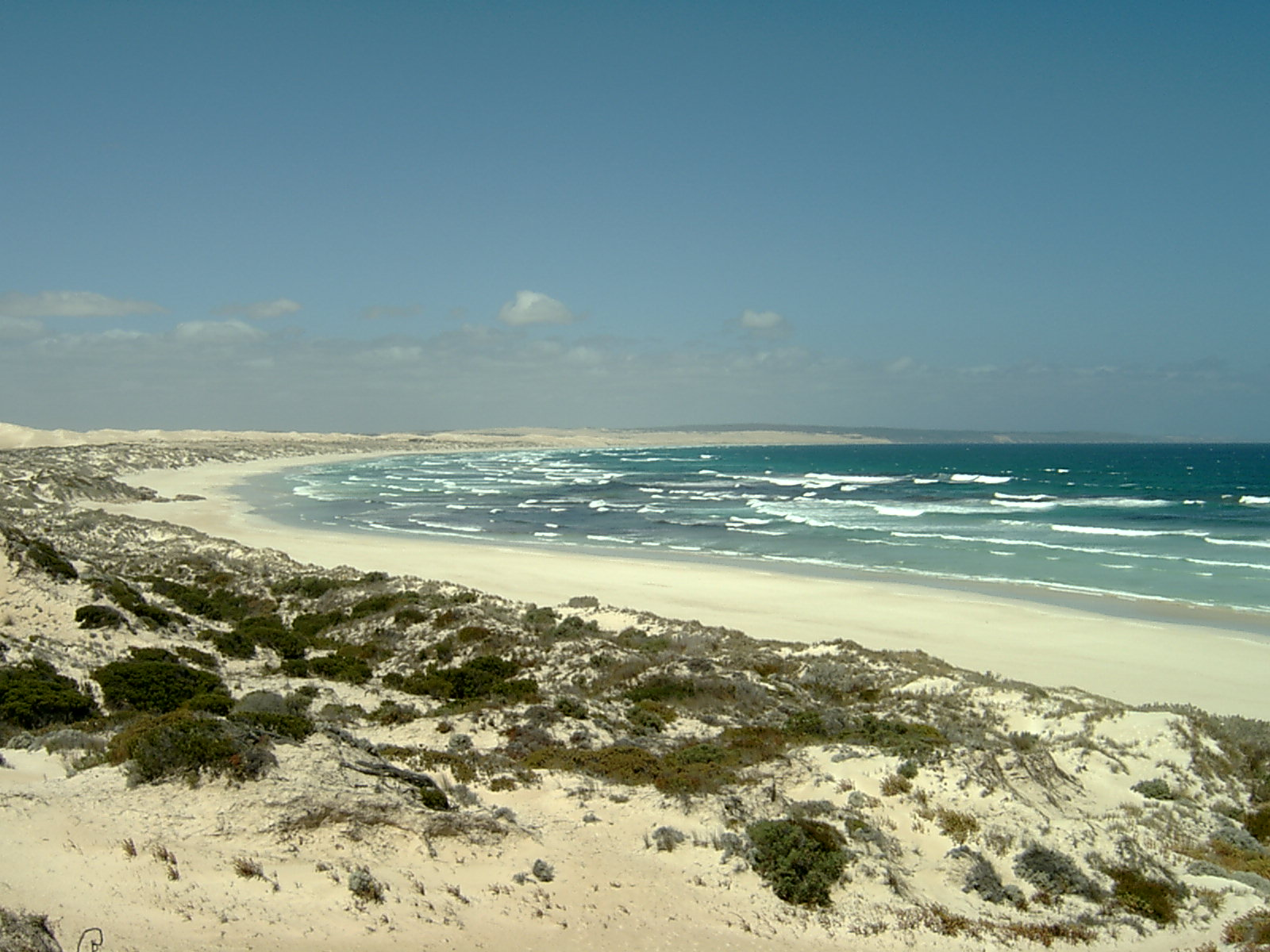
Almonta Beach

== See also ==
- Protected areas of South Australia
- Avoid Bay Islands Conservation Park
- Kellidie Bay Conservation Park
- Mount Dutton Bay Conservation Park
- Whidbey Isles Conservation Park
