= Point Avoid =

Point Avoid South Australia
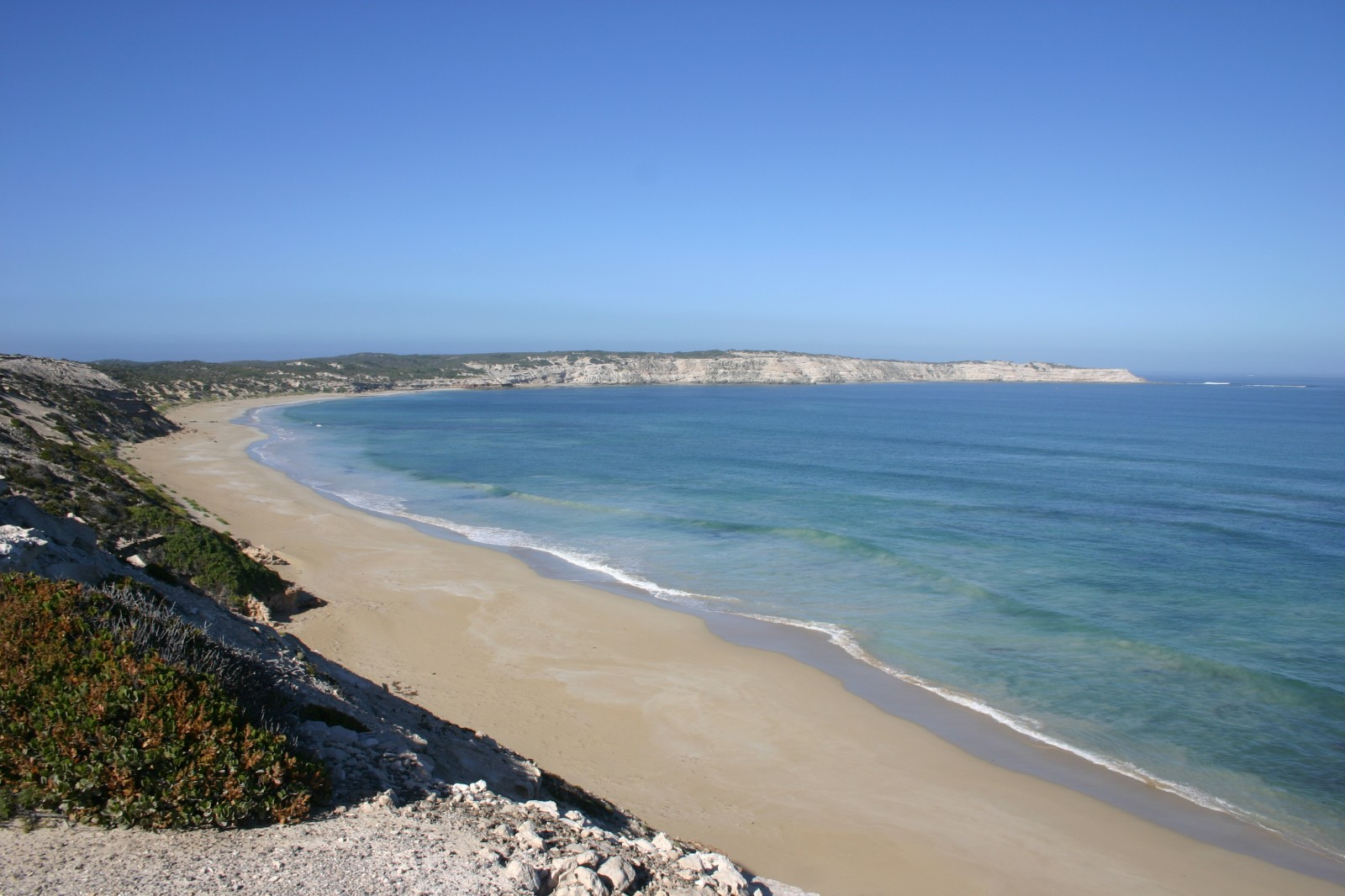
- View of Limestone cliffs and beach that finish at Point Avoid

- Coordinates: 34°40′50.1″S 135°19′16.9″E
- Elevation: 46 m (151 ft)
- Location: 15 km (9 mi) south west of Coffin Bay

Point Avoid is a headland located at the south eastern extremity of both Coffin Bay Peninsula and Avoid Bay on the west coast of Eyre Peninsula in South Australia about 15 kilometres (9.3 miles) south west of the town of Coffin Bay. It was described in 2017 as being “fronted on all of its seaward sides by limestone cliffs, about 46 metres (151 feet) high, which change abruptly to sand hills E of its S(outhern) extremity.” It was named by Matthew Flinders on 17 February 1802 to acknowledge the navigational hazards present around its shores. The point is currently located within the boundaries of the protected area, the Coffin Bay National Park.
