= Point Whidbey =

Point Whidbey South Australia
- Coordinates: 34°35′18″S 135°6′33″E
- Location: 34 km (21 mi) west of Coffin Bay.

Point Whidbey is a headland located at the southern western extremity of both Coffin Bay Peninsula and Avoid Bay on the west coast of Eyre Peninsula in South Australia about 34 kilometres (21 miles) west of the town of Coffin Bay. It was described in 2012 as being “fronted by low cliffs and rises to a round hill, 62 metres (203 feet) high, about 1 mile inland.” It is one of the features named by Matthew Flinders in February 1802 after his friend and Royal Navy officer, Joseph Whidbey. The point is currently located within the boundaries of the protected area, the Coffin Bay National Park.
