= Coffin Bay Peninsula =

Coffin Bay Peninsula South Australia
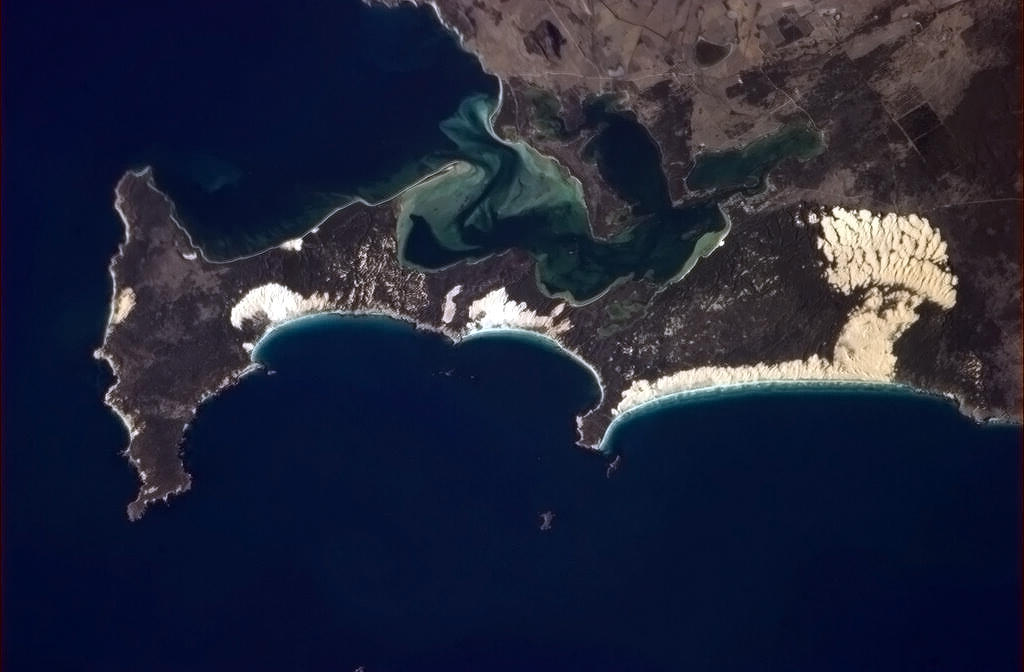
- Coffin Bay photographed from the ISS with the peninsula being located to the south

- Coordinates: 34°34′29″S 135°18′12″E

Coffin Bay Peninsula is a peninsula located at the south west end of Eyre Peninsula in South Australia. It extends in a north westerly direction from its connection to Eyre Peninsula and is bounded by Coffin Bay, Port Douglas and Yangie Bay to the north, the Great Australian Bight to the west and Avoid Bay to the south. Its extremities are Point St Isaac in the north, Point Whidbey in the south west, Point Longnose in the north east and Point Avoid in the south east. Its name is derived from Coffin Bay which was named by Matthew Flinders on 16 February 1802, after Sir Isaac Coffin, 1st Baronet. While parts of its surface have been cleared and used for agricultural purposes in the past, it is currently occupied by the protected area, the Coffin Bay National Park.
