= Avoid Bay Islands Conservation Park =

Protected area in South Australia

- IUCN category Ia (strict nature reserve)
- Location within South Australia
- Location: South Australia
- Nearest city: Coffin Bay
- Coordinates: 34°36′50.65″S 135°17′13.04″E
- Area: 32 ha (79 acres)
- Established: 2 May 1968
- Governing body: Department for Environment and Water

The Avoid Bay Islands Conservation Park is a protected area in the Australian state of South Australia occupying three islands located west-southwest of Coffin Bay on the Eyre Peninsula. The group, which includes Black Rocks and Sudden Jerk Island (also known as Avoid Island), supports breeding populations of seabirds and marine mammals. Colonies of the endangered Australian sea lion (Neophoca cinerea) and protected New Zealand fur seal (Arctocephalus forsteri) occur on some of these islands. The conservation park is classified as an IUCN Category Ia protected area.
