= Joseph Whidbey =

18/19th-century British naval engineer and explorer

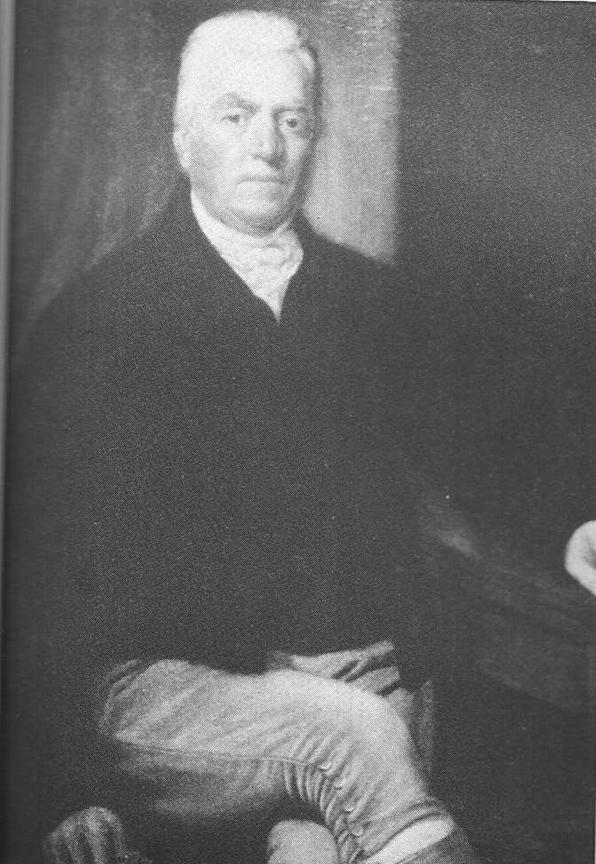
- A Portrait of Joseph Whidbey
- Born: 1757
- Died: 9 October 1833 (aged 75–76)
- Military career
- Allegiance: United Kingdom
- Branch: Royal Navy
- Service years: 1779–1830

Joseph Whidbey FRS (1757 – 9 October 1833) was a member of the Royal Navy who served on the Vancouver Expedition 1791–95, and later achieved renown as a naval engineer. He is notable for having been the first European to discover and chart Admiralty Island in the Alexander Archipelago in Alaska in 1794.

Little is recorded of Whidbey's life before his warranting as a sailing master in 1779. After years of service during the War of American Independence, he received a peacetime appointment to HMS Europa, where with then-Lieutenant George Vancouver, he conducted a detailed survey of Port Royal in Jamaica.

Europa paid off, but Whidbey soon gained a berth, along with Vancouver, in the newly built HMS Discovery. During the Nootka Crisis, both men were transferred to HMS Courageux, but returned to Discovery and departed for the northwest coast of America.

In 1792, Whidbey accompanied Lieutenant Peter Puget in small boats to explore what was later named Puget Sound in Washington state. On 2 June, the team discovered Deception Pass, establishing the insularity of the Sound's largest island, which Vancouver named Whidbey Island.

Upon Discovery's return to England, Whidbey served briefly in HMS Sans Pareil, but eventually turned to a shoreside career. In 1799, the then Earl St Vincent commissioned him to make a feasibility study of making Tor Bay a fleet anchorage; Whidbey recommended this be done by building a great breakwater. Surviving correspondence suggests that around this time he apparently struck up a lifelong friendly and professional relationship with the engineer John Rennie.

Whidbey was appointed Master Attendant at Sheerness in 1799. His innovative salvage of the Dutch frigate ‘Ambuscade’ was the subject of a paper read to the Royal Society in 1803. In 1804 he received the prestigious appointment as Master Attendant at Woolwich, one of the Royal Navy's greatest dockyards. In 1805, Whidbey became a Fellow of the Royal Society, sponsored by a long list of distinguished men of science: Alexander Dalrymple, James Rennell, William Marsden, James Stanier Clarke, Sir Gilbert Blane, Mark Beaufoy, Joseph Huddart, and John Rennie.

In 1806, as the Napoleonic Wars impended, Whidbey joined Rennie in planning the Plymouth Breakwater, at St Vincent's request; in 1811 came the order to begin construction and Whidbey was appointed Acting Superintending Engineer. This task required great engineering, organizational and political skills, as the many strictly technical challenges were complicated by the significant resources devoted to the project, from which various parties evidenced a desire for advantage. Nearly 4,000,000 (four million) tons of stone were quarried and transported, using about a dozen ships innovatively designed by the two men.

Construction started on 8 August 1812; it was sufficiently completed by 1814 to shelter ships of the line, although work continued for over 50 years. Napoleon was reported as commenting that it was a grand thing, as he passed by it on the way to exile on St. Helena in 1815.

Whidbey continued to work on the breakwater and other engineering projects, including the breakwater's lighthouse (designed by Trinity House), until retirement around 1830. His contribution to the Royal Society includes an 1817 paper on fossils found in the Plymouth quarries.

== Character ==
Records of the Vancouver Expedition suggest that Whidbey was an expert and reliable seaman, entrusted with difficult tasks. However, upon his return to England, he provided testimony for Sir Joseph Banks' campaign against George Vancouver (Whidbey was at the time competing with Vancouver for the pay accrued as Astronomer for the voyage.) Vancouver soon died, perhaps mooting difficulties in their relationship.

At any rate, Whidbey rose swiftly from his humble beginnings, undoubtedly due to his proven technical skill as much as to his connections.

Correspondence between Whidbey and John Rennie suggests a close and honest working relationship, and an earthy sense of humour. For example, when Sir Francis Northwell pestered the two with the idea that a large hole in the floor of Plymouth bay might complicate construction, Whidbey wrote to Rennie that, should such a feature be discovered, it would be named Lady Northwell's Hole.

== Legacy ==
It is not thought that Whidbey married or had children. A copy of his will was discovered in 2022 and is now in the collection of the South Whidbey Historical Society. The document suggests that Whidbey left his servants his wine and spirits. He bequeathed money to his niece, her daughter and his friends. Notably, the gift to his great-niece was sizeable and left with explicit directions that it should not go to her current or any future husband. Whidbey's house near Plymouth still stands, and is called Bovisand House.

Numerous features around Whidbey Island bear the Whidbey name, such as Joseph Whidbey State Park and Whidbey Island Naval Air Station. From the latter comes the name of the Whidbey Island-class dock landing ship. In Britain, the Whidbey Automatic Light (Occulting Green) was constructed at the eastern end of Plymouth Sound in 1980.

In what is now South Australia, Matthew Flinders in February 1802 named the following geographical features "after my worthy friend, the former master-attendant at Sheerness" – the Whidbey Isles and Point Whidbey.
