= Australian Pony =

Breed of horse

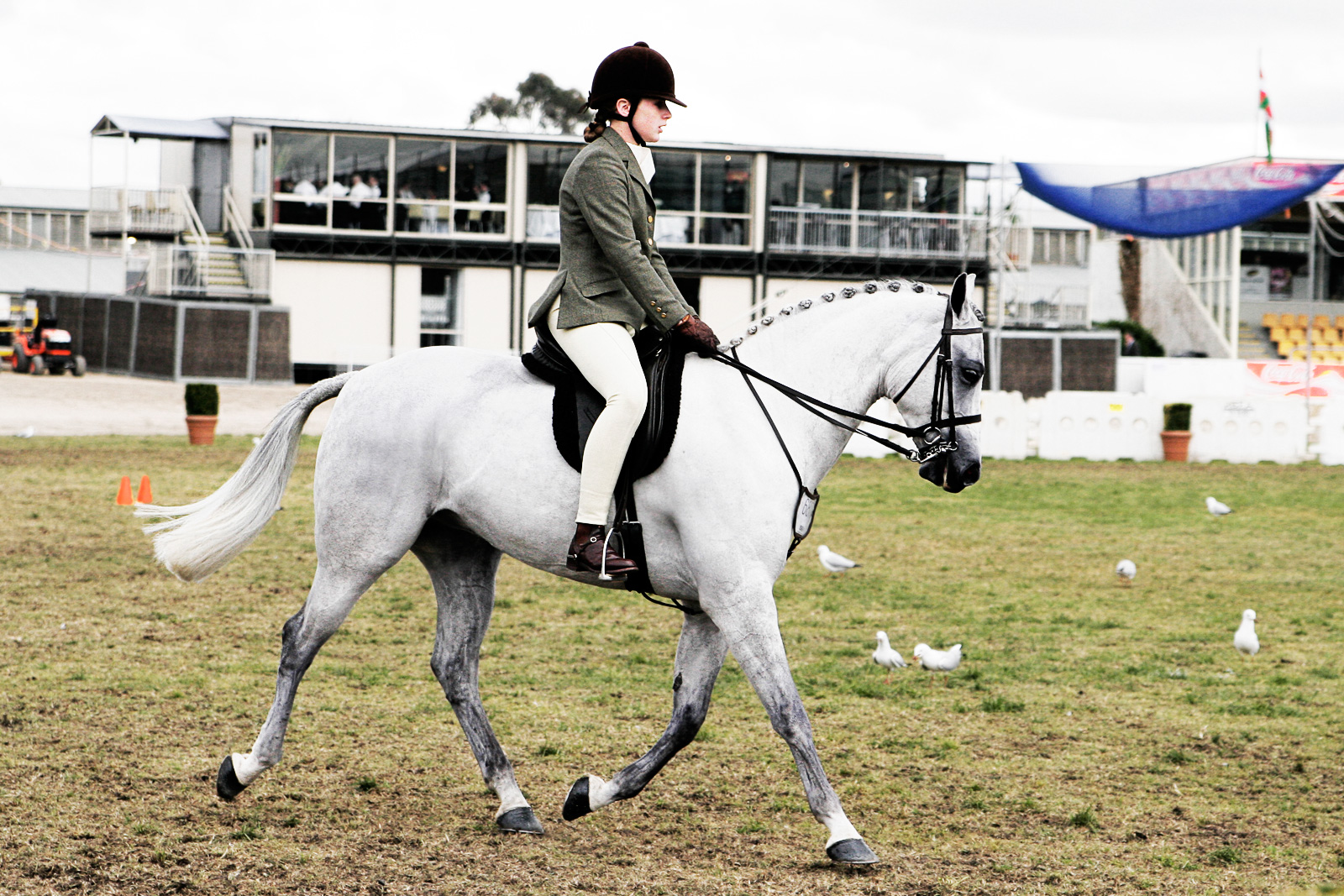
- Country of origin: Australia

Traits
- Distinguishing features: Between 11 and 14 hands high. Shows quality pony characteristics, with strong resemblance to the Welsh pony

The Australian Pony is a breed of pony that developed in Australia. It was greatly influenced by the native British breeds, especially the Welsh Pony, as well as some Arabian bloodlines.

== Characteristics ==
The Australian Pony stands between 11 and 14 hands (44 and 56 inches, 112 and 142 cm). It strongly shows the refining Welsh Mountain Pony influence. The head is distinctly 'pony', full of show quality, with alert ears and large, dark eyes. The neck is relatively short but well-set and nicely rounded, the shoulders slope well back and the hindquarters are well rounded and proportioned. The tail should be well set on and gaily carried. The chest is deep, and the barrel is round. The legs are short and strong, with flat, dense bone.

The overall impression is a very attractive pony showing quality. Most representatives of the breed are grey, although they may be any color.

== History ==
Since the continent had no native horses or ponies prior to the arrival of European explorers and settlers, all equidae that now live there are from imported stock. Nine horses first arrived in Australia in 1788 in the First Fleet from South Africa. In 1803, the first Timor Ponies arrived from Indonesia, and provided the foundation stock for the breed. The Australian Pony also had later influence from the Welsh Mountain Pony, Hackney pony, Arabian, Shetland Pony, Highland Pony, Connemara Pony, Exmoor Pony, and from small Thoroughbreds.

Stallions of influence included:

- Sir Thomas and Dennington Court: Two Exmoor pony stallions imported in the mid-19th century
- Bonnie Charlie (imp): Hungarian stallion thought to have been brought to Australia with a circus in the mid-19th century.
- Dyoll Greylight: Welsh Mountain Pony which arrived in 1911, considered a founding sire.
- Little Jim (imp): a brown Welsh Cob with English Hackney bloodlines was imported in 1909.

By 1920, a distinct type of pony had emerged in Australia, and in 1931, the first Australian pony stud book, the Australian Pony Stud Book Society, was formed. The Australian Pony section of the stud book incorporated all of the Mountain and moorland pony breeds that had been imported from the turn of the 20th century as well as the pony breeds which had been developed in Australia.

Some Arabian influence was introduced in the 1940s, when for a short time, breeders could use an Arabian stallion over APSB mares. In the mid-1960s the APSB opened sections for Welsh Mountain and Connemara ponies and catered for some other European breeds later.

== Uses ==
Today, the pony is mainly used as a children's mount and for smaller adult riders. They compete in dressage, eventing, show jumping, combined driving, gymkhana, mounted games, and horse shows.

== See also ==
- Australian Riding Pony
- Pony
- Welsh pony
- Riding Pony
