= Pony =

Type of small horse

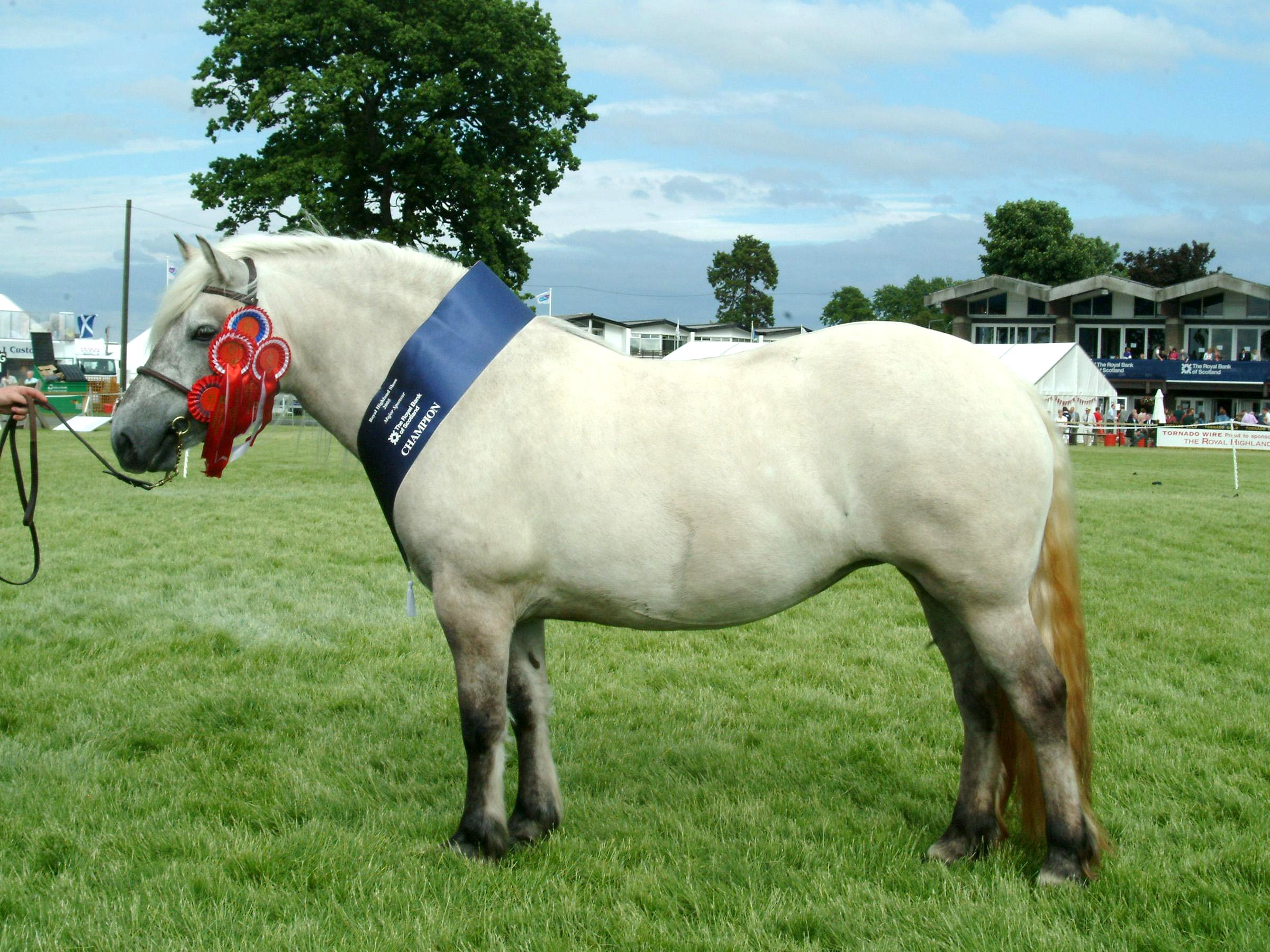
A Highland Pony, demonstrating the pony characteristics of sturdy bone, a thick mane and tail, a small head, and small overall size

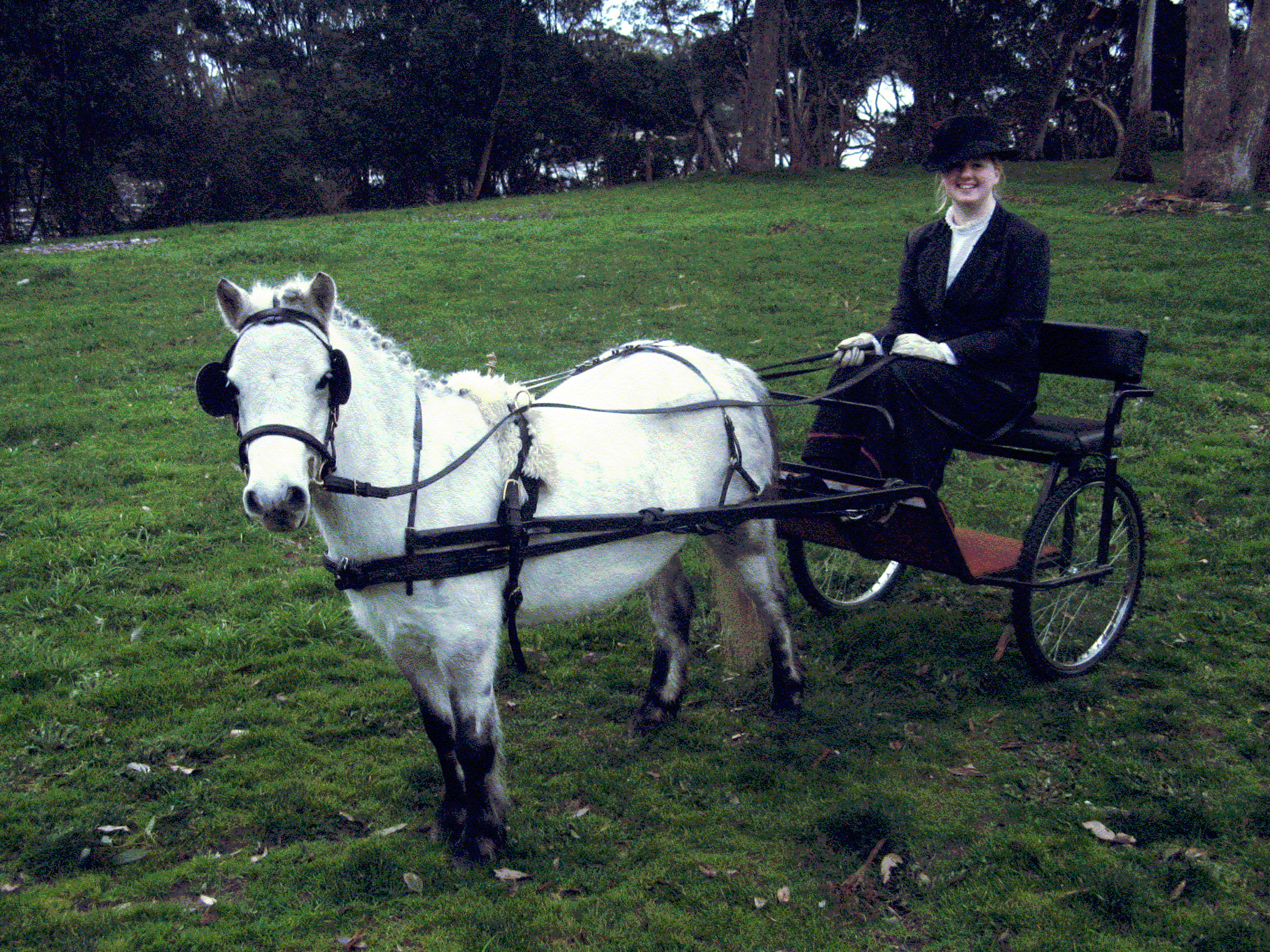
A Shetland pony shown in harness

A pony is a type of small horse, usually under a specific height at full maturity. Ponies often have thicker coats, manes and tails, compared to larger horses, and proportionally shorter legs, wider barrels, heavier bone, thicker necks and shorter heads. In modern use, breed registries and horse shows may define a pony as measuring at the withers below a certain height; height limits varying from about 14 hands (56 inches, 142 cm) to 14.3 hands (59 inches, 150 cm). Some distinguish between horse or pony based on its breed or phenotype, regardless of its height. The word pony derives from the old French poulenet, a diminutive of poulain meaning foal, a young, immature horse. A full-sized horse may sometimes be called a pony as a term of endearment.

== Definition ==
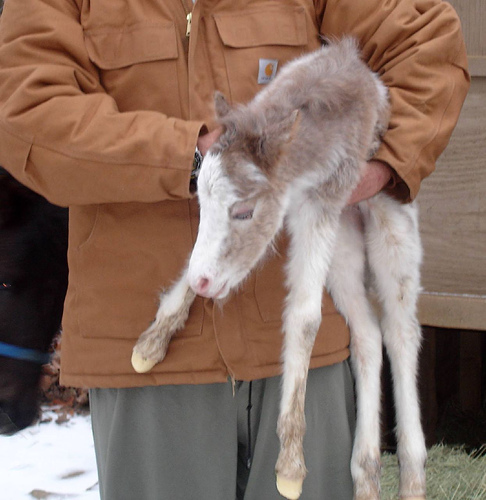
A pony foal

For many forms of competition, the official definition of a pony is a horse that measures up to 14.2 hands (58 inches, 147 cm) at the withers. Standard horses are taller than 14.2. The International Federation for Equestrian Sports defines the official cutoff point at 148 centimetres (58.3 in; 14.2 hands) without shoes and 149 centimetres (58.66 in; 14.2 1/2 hands) with shoes. However, the term pony can be used in general (or affectionately) for any small horse, regardless of its actual size or breed. Furthermore, some horse breeds may have individuals who mature under that height but are still called horses and are allowed to compete as horses. In Australia, horses that measure from 14 to 15 hands (142 to 152 cm; 56 to 60 inches) are known as a "galloway", and ponies in Australia measure under 14 hands (56 inches, 142 cm).

== Characteristics ==
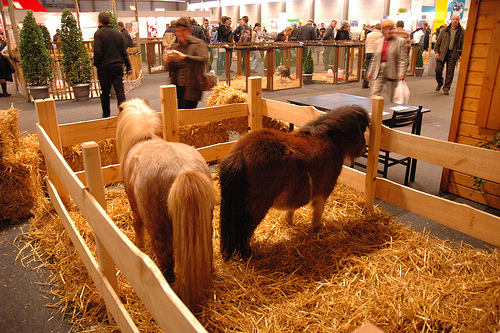
The Shetland pony is one of the smallest pony breeds, but is very strong.

Ponies are often distinguished by their phenotype, a stocky body, dense bone, round shape and well-sprung ribs. They have a short head, large eyes and small ears. In addition to being smaller than a horse, their legs are proportionately shorter. They have strong hooves and grow a heavier hair coat, seen in a thicker mane and tail as well as a particularly heavy winter coat.

Pony breeds have developed all over the world, particularly in cold and harsh climates where hardy, sturdy working animals were needed. They are remarkably strong for their size. Breeds such as the Connemara pony are recognized for their ability to carry a full-sized adult rider. Pound for pound, ponies can pull and carry more weight than a horse. Draft-type ponies are able to pull loads significantly greater than their own weight, with larger ponies capable of pulling loads comparable to those pulled by full-sized draft horses, and even very small ponies are able to pull as much as 450 percent of their own weight.

Nearly all pony breeds are very hardy, easy keepers that share the ability to thrive on a more limited diet than that of a regular-sized horse, requiring half the hay for their weight as a horse, and often not needing grain at all. However, for the same reason, they are also more vulnerable to laminitis and Cushing's syndrome. They may also have problems with hyperlipidemia.

Ponies are generally considered intelligent and friendly, though sometimes they also are described as stubborn or cunning. The differences of opinion often result from an individual pony's degree of proper training. Ponies trained by inexperienced individuals, or only ridden by beginners, can turn out to be spoiled because their riders typically lack the experience base to correct bad habits. Properly trained ponies are appropriate mounts for children who are learning to ride. Larger ponies can be ridden by adults, as ponies are usually strong for their size.

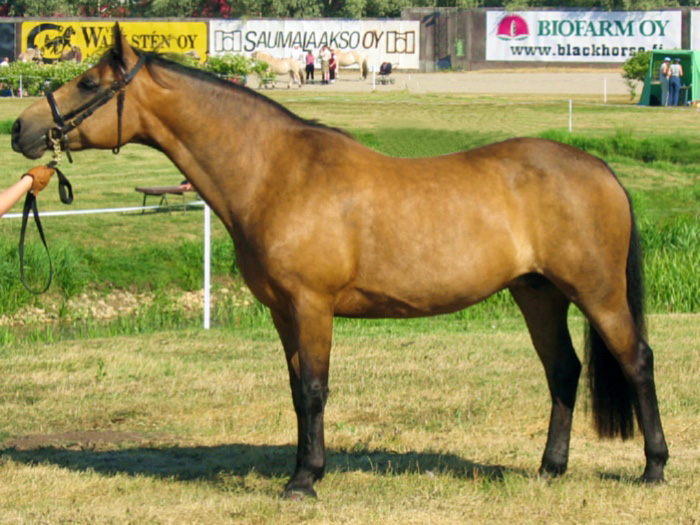
The Connemara pony is a larger pony which occasionally matures over 14.2 hands (58 inches, 147 cm)

For showing purposes, ponies are often grouped into small, medium, and large sizes. Small ponies are 12.2 hands (50 inches, 127 cm) and under, medium ponies are over 12.2 but no taller than 13.2 hands (54 inches, 137 cm), and large ponies are over 13.2 hands (54 inches, 137 cm) but no taller than 14.2 hands (58 inches, 147 cm).

The smallest equines are called miniature horses by many of their breeders and breed organizations, rather than ponies, even though they stand smaller than small ponies, usually no taller than 38 inches (97 cm; 9.2 hands) at the withers. There are also miniature pony breeds.

== History ==
Ponies originally developed as a landrace adapted to a harsh natural environment, and were considered part of the "draft" subtype typical of Northern Europe. At one time, it was hypothesized that they may have descended from a wild "draft" subspecies of Equus ferus. Studies of mitochondrial DNA (which is passed on through the female line) indicate that a large number of wild mares have contributed to modern domestic breeds; in contrast, studies of y-DNA (passed down the male line) suggest that there was possibly just one single male ancestor of all domesticated breeds. Domestication of the horse probably first occurred in the Eurasian steppes with horses of between 13 hands (52 inches, 132 cm) to over 14 hands (56 inches, 142 cm), and as horse domestication spread, the male descendants of the original stallion went on to be bred with local wild mares.

Domesticated ponies of all breeds originally developed mainly from the need for a working animal that could fulfill specific local draft and transportation needs while surviving in harsh environments. The usefulness of the pony was noted by farmers who observed that a pony could outperform a draft horse on small farms.

By the 20th century, many pony breeds had Arabian and other blood added to make a more refined pony suitable for riding.

== Uses ==
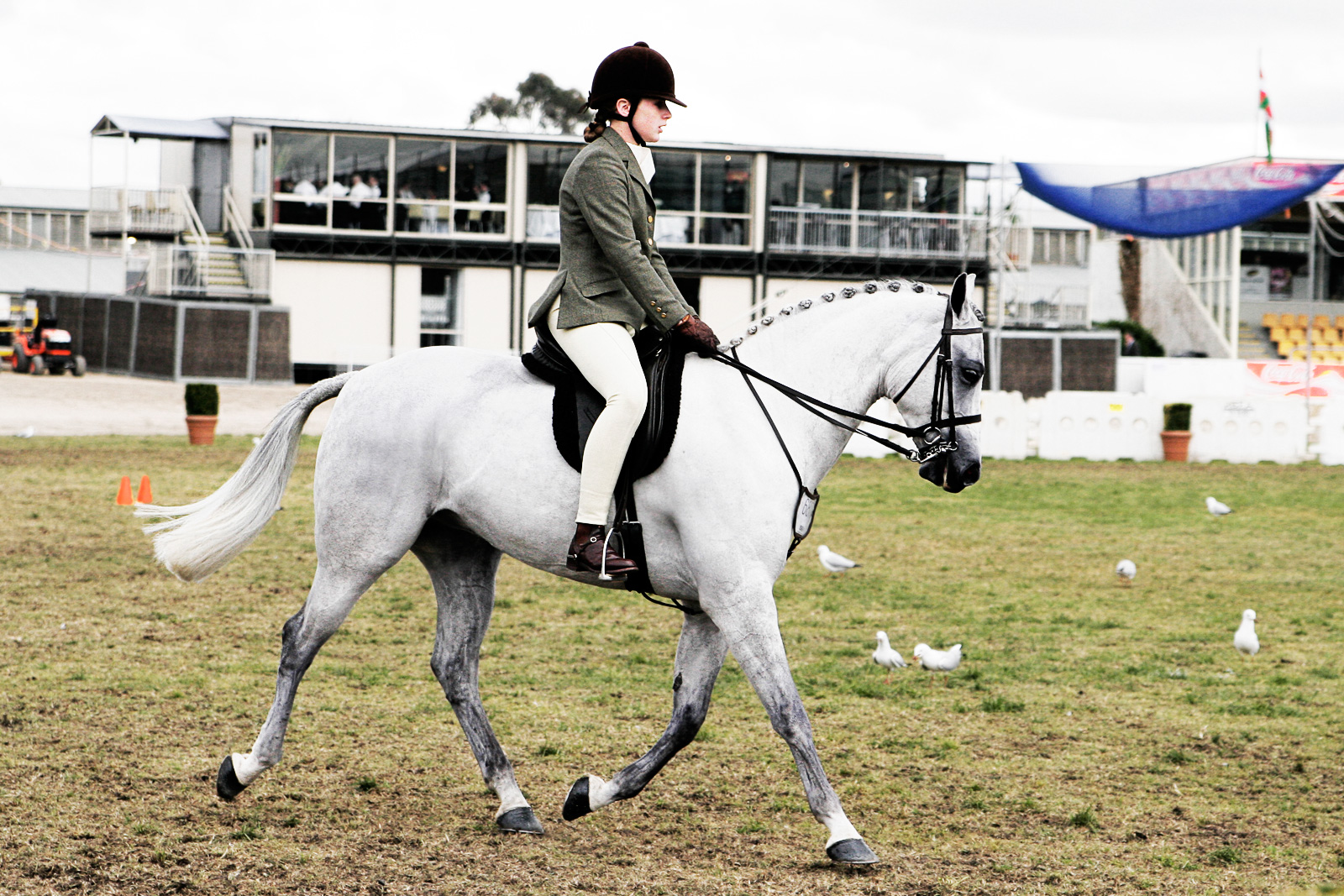
An Australian Pony shown under saddle

In many parts of the world, ponies are used as working animals, as pack animals and for pulling various horse-drawn vehicles. They are seen in many different equestrian pursuits. Some breeds, such as the Hackney pony, are primarily used for driving, while other breeds, such as the Connemara pony and Australian Pony, are used primarily for riding. Others, such as the Welsh pony, are used for both riding and driving. There is no direct correlation between a horse's size and its inherent athletic ability.

== Similar or similarly named horses ==
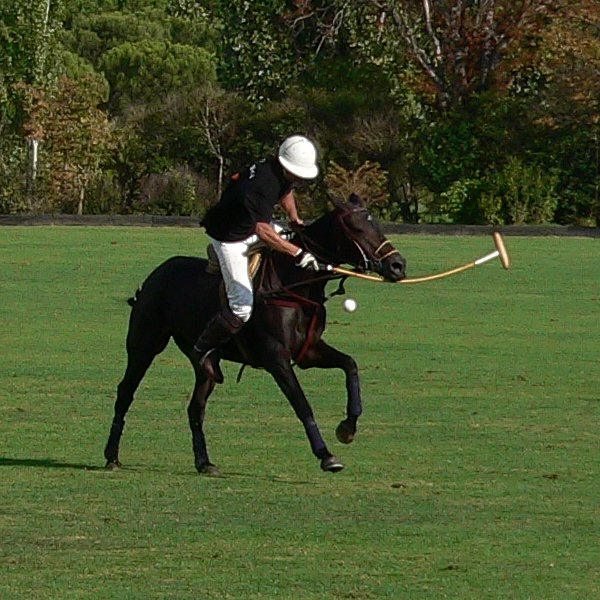
The full-sized horses used for polo are called "polo ponies"

Some horse breeds are not defined as ponies, even when they have some animals that measure under 14.2 hands (58 inches, 147 cm). This is usually due to body build, traditional uses and overall physiology. Breeds that are considered horses regardless of height include the Arabian horse, Icelandic horse, American Quarter Horse and the Morgan horse, all of which have individual members both over and under 14.2 hands (58 inches, 147 cm).

Many horse breeds have some pony characteristics, such as small size, a heavy coat, a thick mane or heavy bone, but are considered to be horses. In cases such as these, there can be considerable debate over whether to call certain breeds "horses" or "ponies." However, individual breed registries usually are the arbiters of such debates, weighing the relative horse and pony characteristics of a breed. In some breeds, such as the Welsh pony, the horse-versus-pony controversy is resolved by creating separate divisions for consistently horse-sized animals, such as the "Section D" Welsh Cob.

Some horses may be pony height due to environment more than genetics. For example, the Chincoteague pony, a feral horse that lives on Assateague Island off the coasts of Maryland and Virginia, often matures to the height of an average small horse when raised from a foal under domesticated conditions.

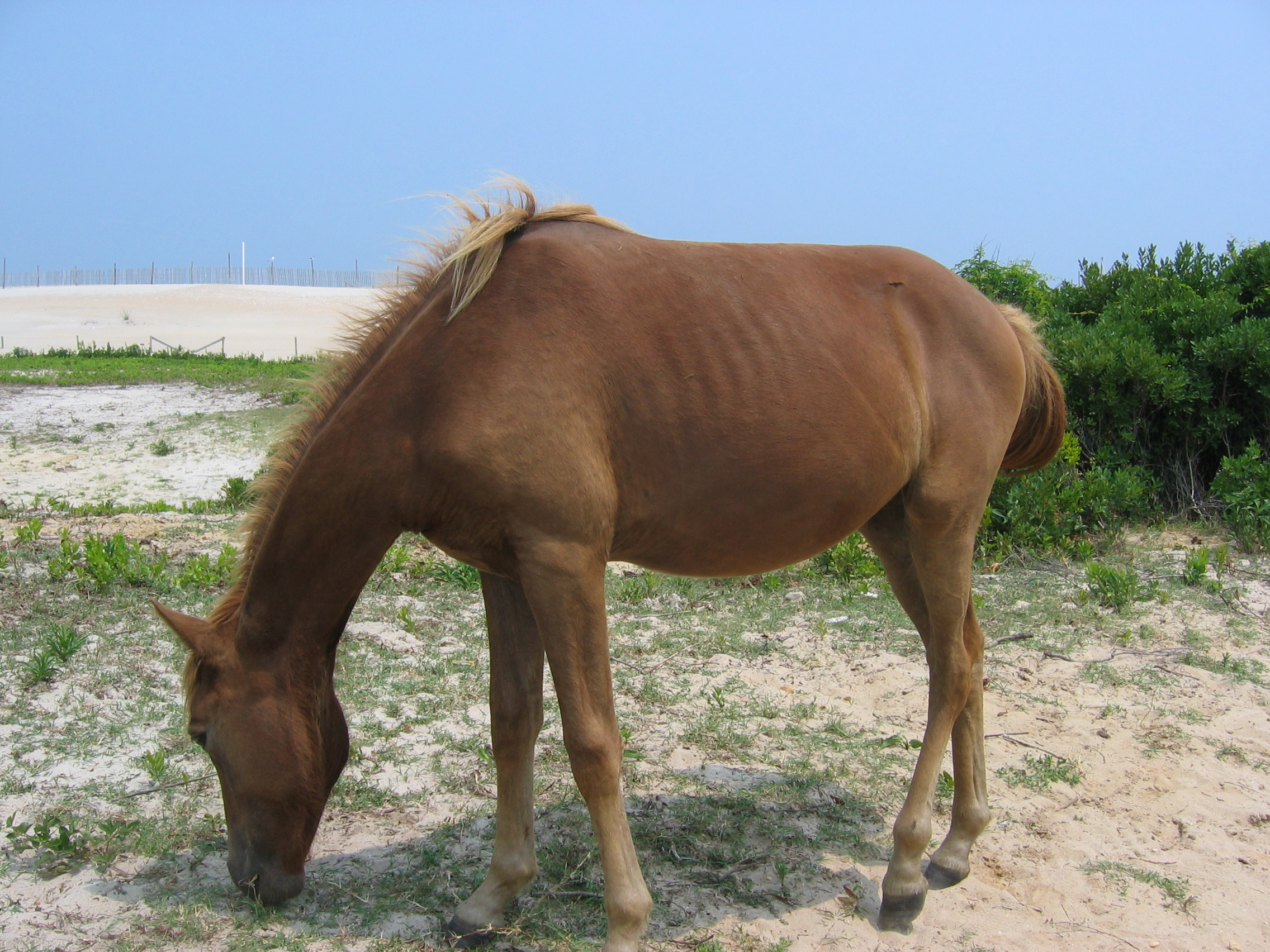
There is debate over whether the feral Chincoteague ponies of Assateague Island are horses or ponies

Conversely, the term "pony" is occasionally used to describe horses of normal height. Horses used for polo are often called "polo ponies" regardless of height, even though they are often of Thoroughbred breeding and often well over 14.2 hands (58 inches, 147 cm). American Indigenous tribes also have the tradition of referring to their horses as "ponies", when speaking in English, even though many of the Mustang horses they used in the 19th century were close to or over 14.2 hands (58 inches, 147 cm), and most horses owned and bred by Native peoples today are of full horse height. Non-racing horses at racetracks that are used to lead the racehorses, ponying them, are called "pony horses".

The term "pony" is also sometimes used to describe a full-sized horse in a humorous or affectionate sense.

The Pony Club, an equestrian youth organization, uses the term "pony" for any mount ridden by a member, regardless of its breed or size. Pony Club members are allowed to compete with full-size horses and are not limited to pony-sized mounts.

== See also ==
- List of horse breeds § Pony breeds
- Pony Club – International youth organization
- Norman Thelwell — the late British artist known for his cartoons of ponies and their riders
- Pony Express – 1860–1861 mail service in the United States
