= Timor Pony =

Breed of horse

Timor
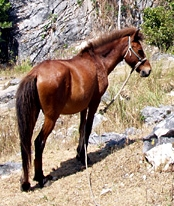

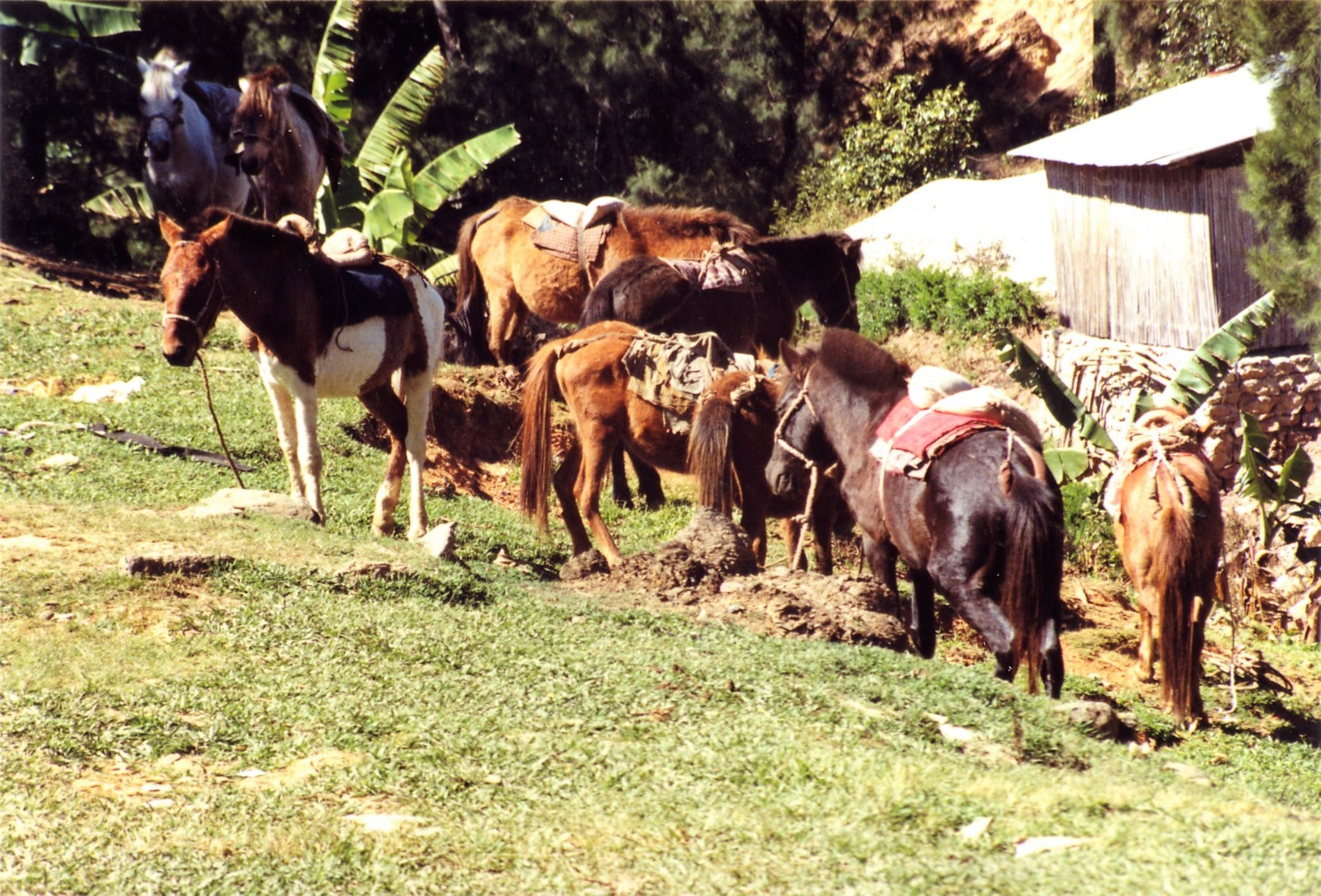
- Country of origin: Indonesia, Timor-Leste

The Timor Pony was developed on the island of Timor, likely from Indian breeds of horses and ponies that were imported to the island. The Timor Pony is thought to be closely related to the Flores Pony, which was developed on nearby Flores island. Both breeds are used by the local people for cattle work, as well as riding, driving, and light farm work. Many of these ponies have been exported to Australia, where they have had an influence on the breeding of the Australian Pony.

Timor Ponies are strong, frugal, and agile, and have a quiet and willing temperament. The ponies have a narrow frame, short back, muscular neck, prominent withers, and a sloping croup. The shoulders tend to be straight, but the legs and feet are strong. The ponies usually stand 10 to 12 hands high (40 to 48 inches (102 to 122 cm)), and are usually brown, black, and bay, but a few are gray. The Flores Pony is usually around 12.1 hh and the dominant colors are bay and chestnut.

Sixty Timor Ponies that were imported into Australia formed the foundation of the Coffin Bay pony breed that was developed in South Australia.

The Timor Pony is referenced in the poem The Man from Snowy River by Banjo Paterson, first published in 1890.

== See also ==
- List of Indonesian horse breeds
