= Whidbey Isles Conservation Park =

Protected area in South Australia

- IUCN category Ia (strict nature reserve)
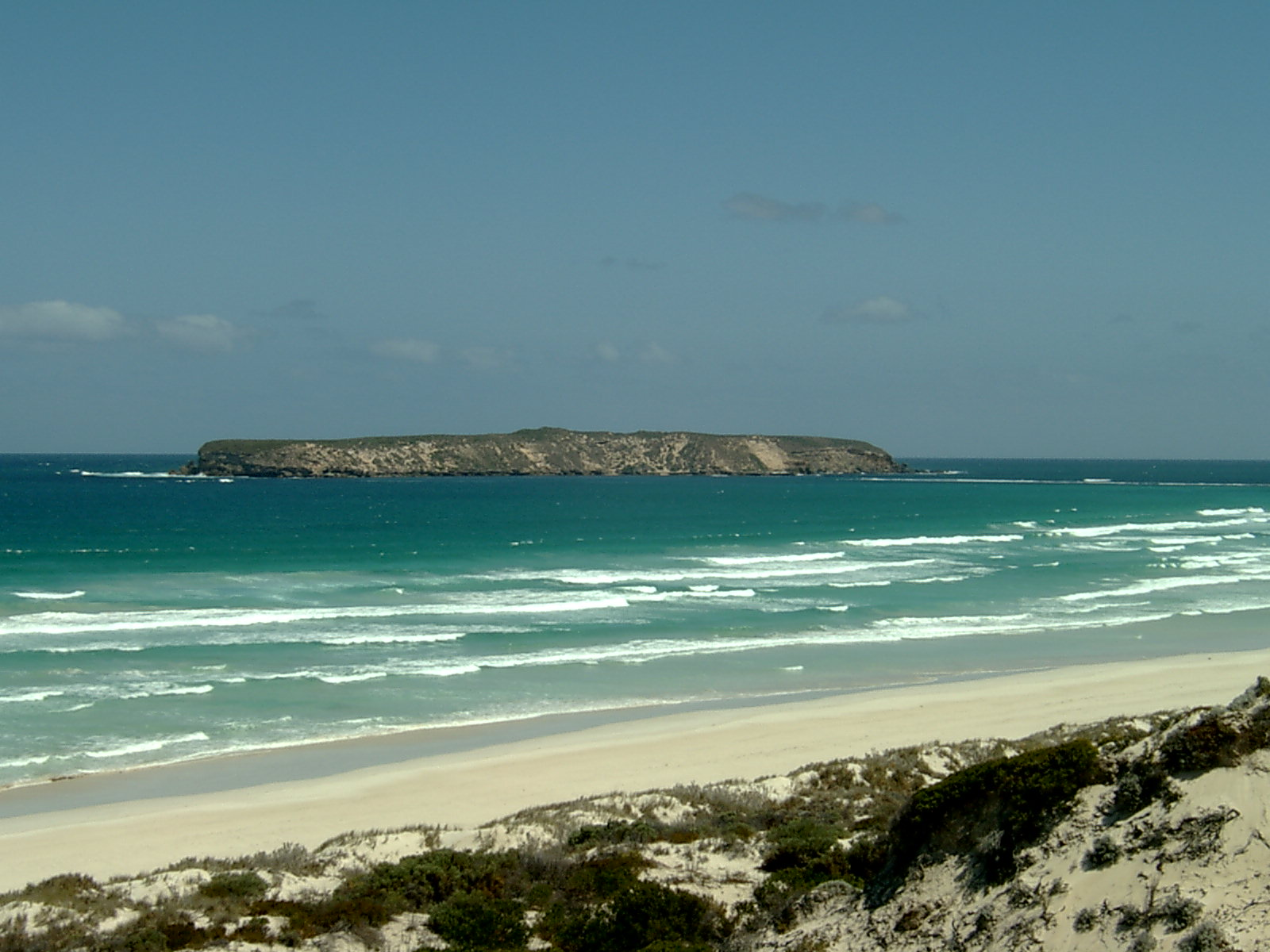
- Golden Island seen from Almonta Beach

- Location within South Australia
- Location: South Australia
- Nearest city: Coffin Bay.
- Coordinates: 34°43′37.6″S 135°09′33″E
- Area: 2.48 km^{2} (0.96 sq mi)
- Established: 16 March 1967
- Governing body: Department for Environment and Water

The Whidbey Isles Conservation Park is a protected area in the Australian state of South Australia which consists of seven islands located about 15 kilometres (9.3 mi) west-southwest of Coffin Bay on the lower Eyre Peninsula.

The conservation park consists of all of the islands in Whidbey Isles, i.e. the Four Hummocks group, Perforated Island, Price Island and Golden Island, with the exception of the most southerly island in the Four Hummocks which is the subject of a lighthouse reserve under the control of the Australian government.

The land within the conservation park first acquired protected area status as a Fauna Conservation Reserve declared under the Crown Lands Act 1929 on 16 March 1967. On 27 April 1972, the fauna conservation reserve was reconstituted as the Whidbey Isles Conservation Park under the National Parks and Wildlife Act 1972. On 19 December 1991, additional land was added to the conservation park to extend protection over land located between high tide and low tide. As of 2019, it covered an area of 2.48 square kilometres (0.96 sq mi).

The Isles supports breeding populations of seabirds and marine mammals. Colonies of the endangered Australian sea lion (Neophoca cinerea) and protected New Zealand fur seal (Arctophoca forsteri) occur on some of these islands.

In 1980, the conservation park was described as follows:

A string of widely scattered islands stretching west-south-west from Point Avoid. The closer islands are limestone, flat with rugged cliffed coastlines and a low shrub vegetation. The Four Hummocks, the most seaward islands of the group and the unnamed rock west of Perforated Island are granite domes with grassy summits.

A group of rugged islands supporting a diverse sea-bird community including breeding populations of short-tailed shearwaters, fairy penguins and rock parrots. The white-breasted sea-eagle and osprey are known to utilise the islands which also support breeding populations of the Australian sea-lion and New Zealand fur seal. The rugged nature of the islands gives them considerable scenic value.

The islands are in pristine condition in the absence of introduced predators and competitors. The southernmost of the Four Hummocks Group is a light house reserve and excluded from the park.

The conservation park is classified as an IUCN Category Ia protected area. In 1980, it was listed on the now-defunct Register of the National Estate. A 1996 survey of South Australia's offshore island identified the Four Hummocks as a little penguin breeding site.

== See also ==
- Joseph Whidbey
