= Sinhalese porcupine quill boxes =

Porcupine quill boxes from Sri Lanka

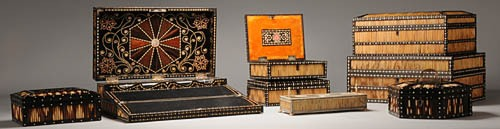
porcupine boxes

Porcupine quill boxes are decorative boxes that are finely inlaid with ivory discs and porcupine quills between bands of ebony. They were highly valued for their rich timbers and intricate craftsmanship.

== Construction ==
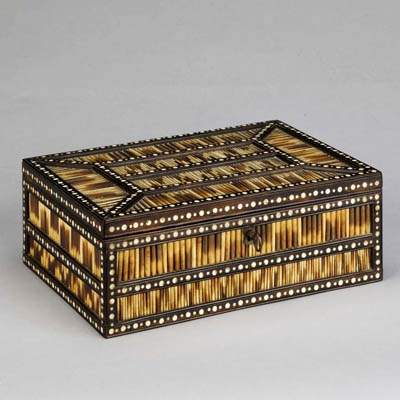

Ceylonese ebony and porcupine quill boxes were mainly produced in southern Ceylon, principally in Galle District and Matara, important trading posts for the thriving export trade. The style of the boxes was very much aimed at the demand of the European market, boxes imitated traditional English forms such as jewellery boxes, sewing baskets and writing boxes. Although porcupine quill boxes were originally made for English residents, by the late 19th century there was a thriving commercial export trade. The production of porcupine quill boxes and furniture mainly falls between around 1850 and 1900. One particular example is in the V&A museum, which was given to Queen Victoria c. 1850.

The number of ivory dots and their proximity to each other are a good indication of a valuable box. The finest boxes from Galle may have an ivory disc positioned every 0.5 cm (0.20 in) on all of the ebony borders. By contrast a lesser box may have dots 25 mm (1 in) apart or more. Boxes from Matara often had two small dots directly above and below larger dots all around the border.

The quality of the porcupine quills used is also a detail to look for. The porcupine's quills can grow up to 40 cm (16 in) long, they naturally drop their quills so they can easily be collected by hand. The base is thick and tapers to a fine and very sharp point. The quills are very strong and to be used in box production must be sliced in half lengthways. Boxes with broader quills from cuts near the quill base are cheaper. Conversely, those with fine quills are much more desirable and thus valuable. There are two types of quill, the first with distinct dark and white bands and the other with plain blond colouration. The coloured quills were used to make chevron patterns, whilst the blond quills offered a cleaner look.

== Variation ==
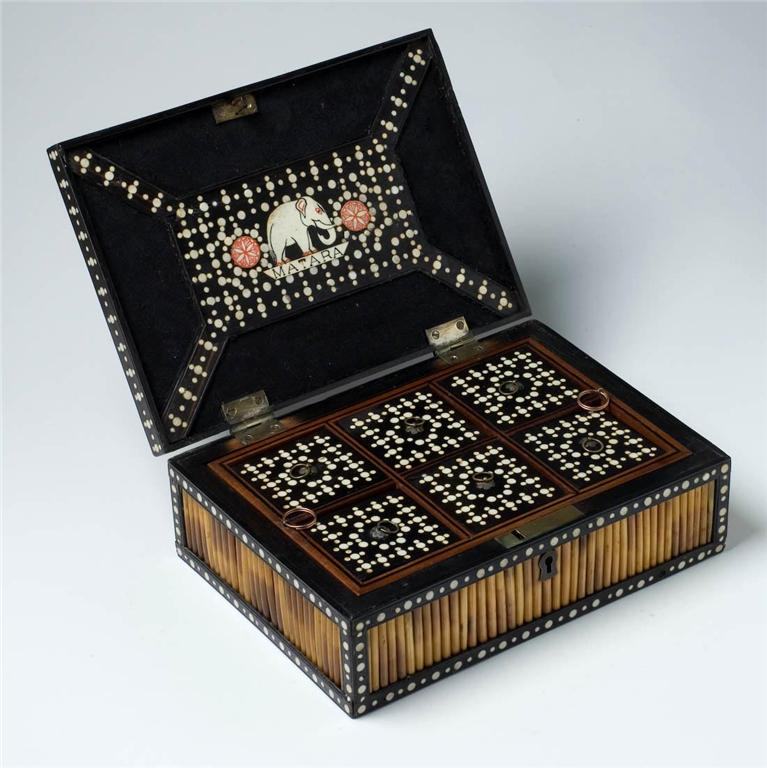

The most common boxes are up to 280 mm (11 in) in width, some have sliding lids and others are hinged with a lock on the front. These boxes are rarely exceptional; however, there is a small group of boxes from Matara that tend to be superior in the use of quills and ivory discs and these boxes command high prices. In general, boxes larger than 330 mm (13 in) wide tend to be superior, they were aimed at the more affluent client who could afford the extra time and attention to detail required.

The quality of timber used was not always very good: it was often not treated or dried properly, so the potential for warping is high.
