= Casket (decorative box) =

Small box to store beauty items

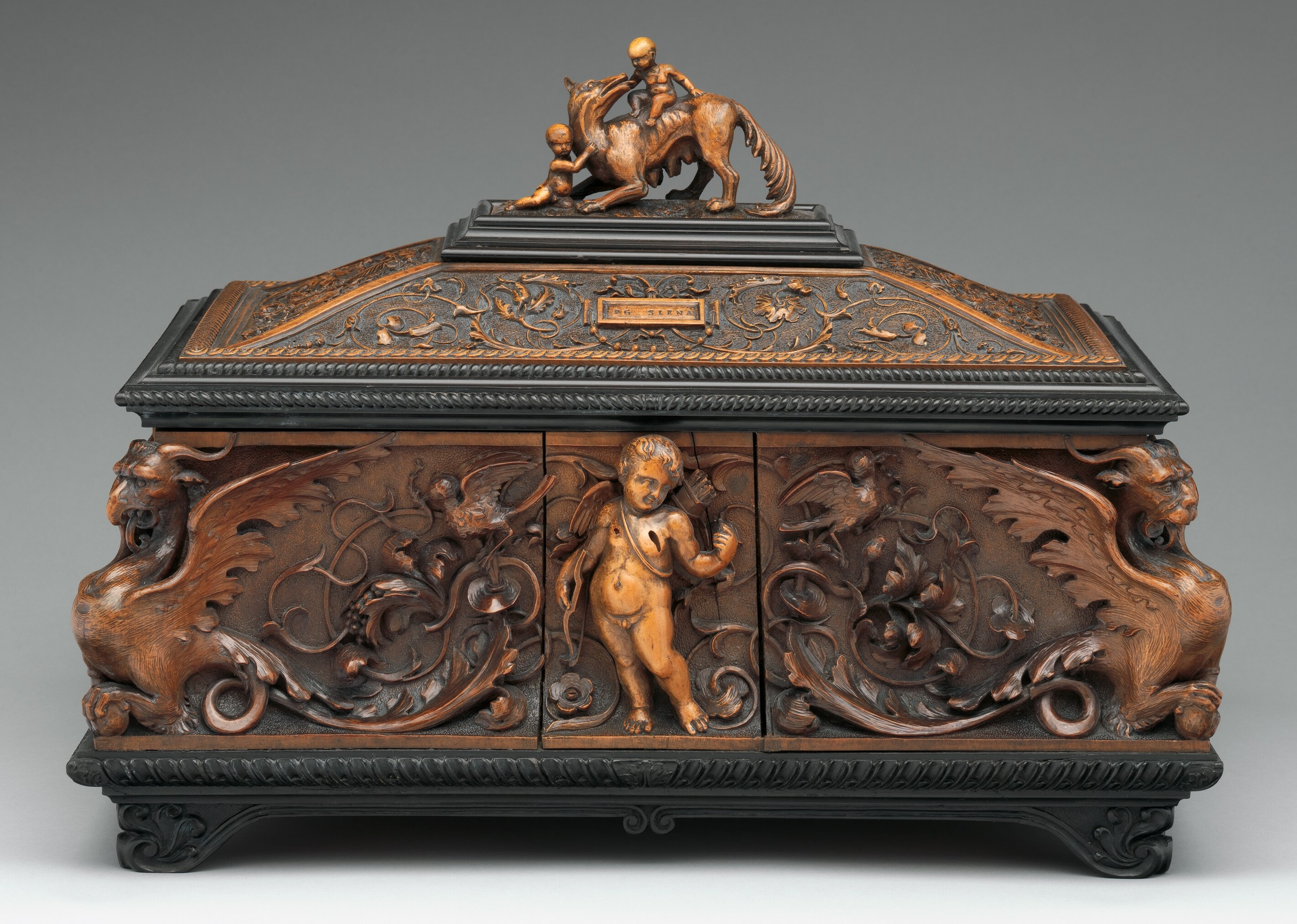
An Italian jewelry casket, 1857, carved walnut, lined with red velvet

A casket is a decorative box or container that is usually smaller than a chest and is typically decorated. In recent centuries they are often used as boxes for jewelry, but in earlier periods they were also used for keeping important documents and many other purposes. Many ancient caskets are reliquaries, for both Buddhist and Christian relics.

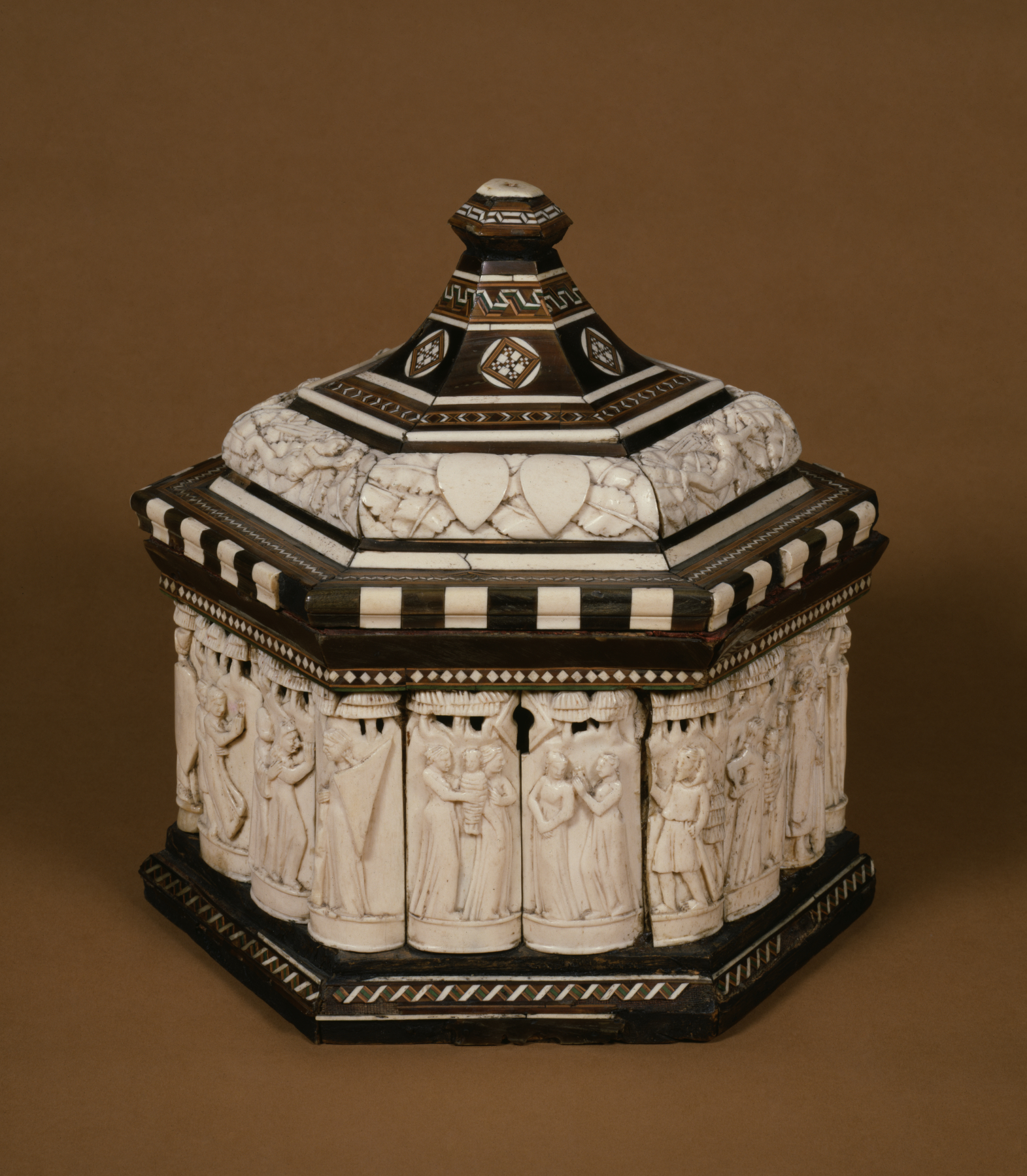
Embriachi workshop, "Bridal Casket with Scenes from the Life of Paris", c. 1430. Carved bone plaques, and certosina inlays.

A tall round casket is often called a pyxis, after a shape in Ancient Greek pottery; these were popular in Islamic art, often made from a section of the ivory tusk of an elephant.

The term "casket" overlaps with strongbox (or strong box), a heavily made box for storing or transporting coin and other valuables. These include more metal, in bands or as the main material, and are functional rather than decorative. Though caskets are often regarded as boxes for jewelry, at least until the Renaissance this was probably not a common use, as at least the most serious jewelry was kept in a strongbox.

== History ==
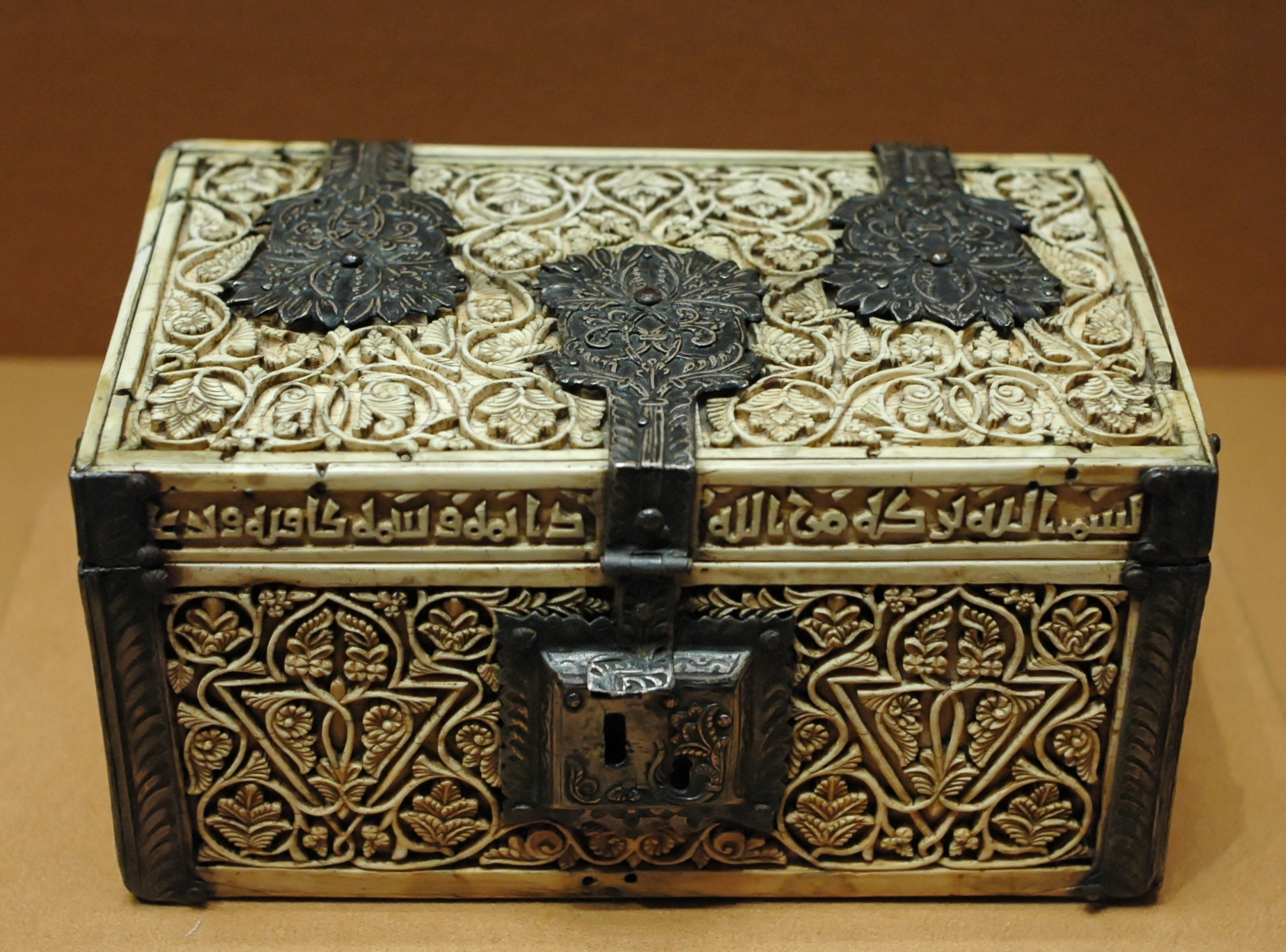
A casket made of ivory and wood with carved decoration and engraved silver, dated 355 AH (1444 or 1445 AD)

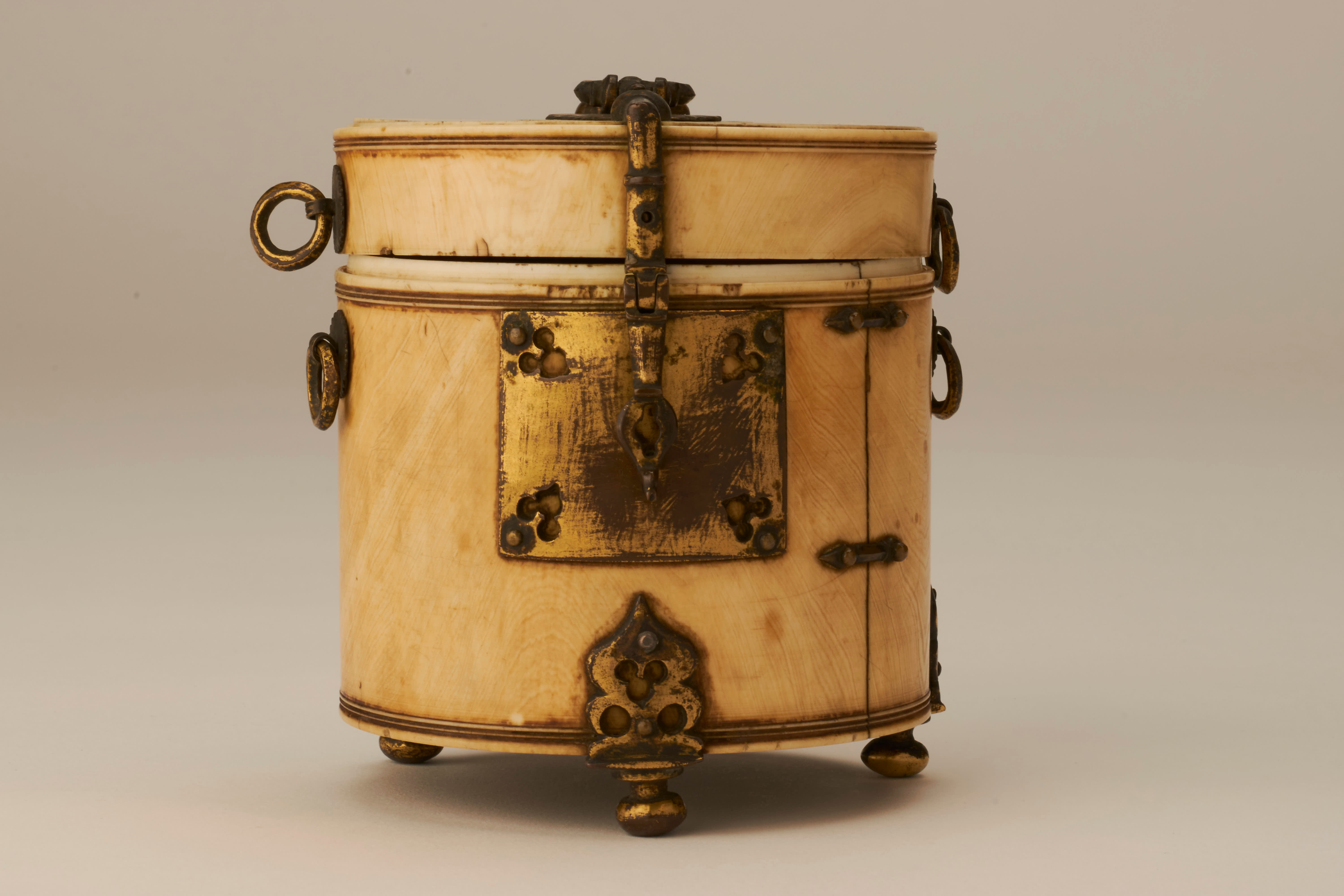
Cylindrical ivory casket, Siculo-Arabic, The Hunt Museum

Surviving caskets from early periods are often made using precious materials, especially ivory, around a wooden framework. In East Asia lacquer over wood is common. The house-shaped chasse is a very common shape for reliquaries in the Early and High Middle Ages, often in Limoges enamel, but some were also secular.

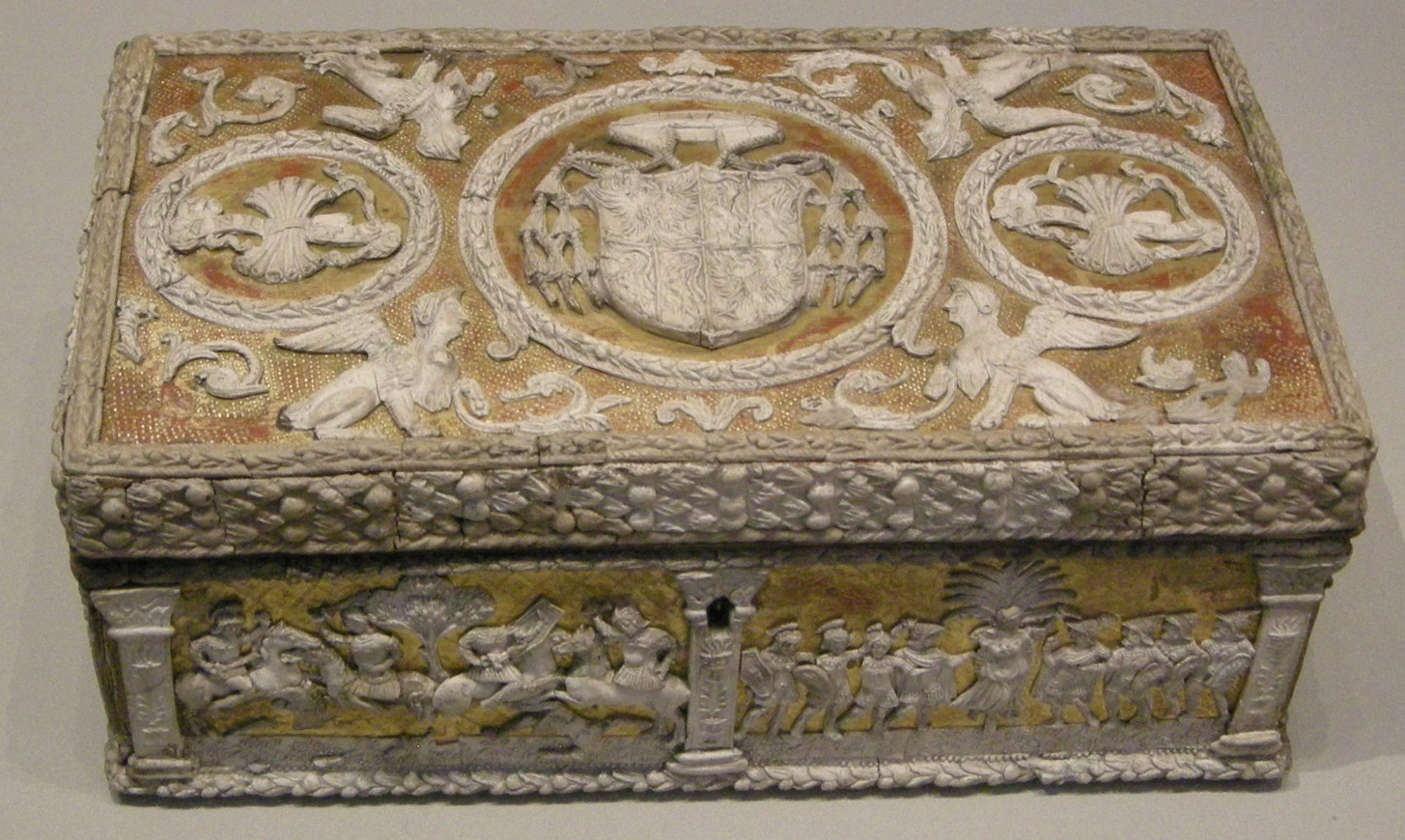
Pastiglia casket made for Cardinal Bernardo Clesio, whose arms allow it to be dated to 1530–38

The Embriachi workshop in north Italy, and their imitators, specialized in "marriage caskets", presumed to have been presented to a bride-to-be by her new in-laws. These were decorated with carved bone plaques, within a setting of certosina inlays in wood, and were produced in the decades around 1400. Later in the 15th century caskets decorated in pastiglia, a type of moulded plaster or gesso, became common for similar purposes.

The so-called Casket letters were allegedly written by Mary, Queen of Scots and found in a casket belong to her husband Lord Bothwell. They suggested her complicity in the murder of her previous husband Lord Darnley, but may well have been invented by her enemies.

A knottekistje is a Dutch type of wedding casket, typically in silver, given by the bridegroom to the bride, containing coins. They replaced cloth wrappers in the 17th century.

== Examples ==
Some examples have remained unburied from the late Roman Empire. The 4th century Brescia Casket, 8th century Franks Casket and 10th-11th century Veroli Casket are all in elaborately carved ivory, a popular material for luxury boxes until recent times. Boxes that contain or contained relics are known as reliquaries, though not all were originally made for this purpose.

== See also ==
- List of caskets
- Coffin
