= Norwich Lanes =

Area in Norwich, England

Coordinates: 52.6298°N 1.2931°E

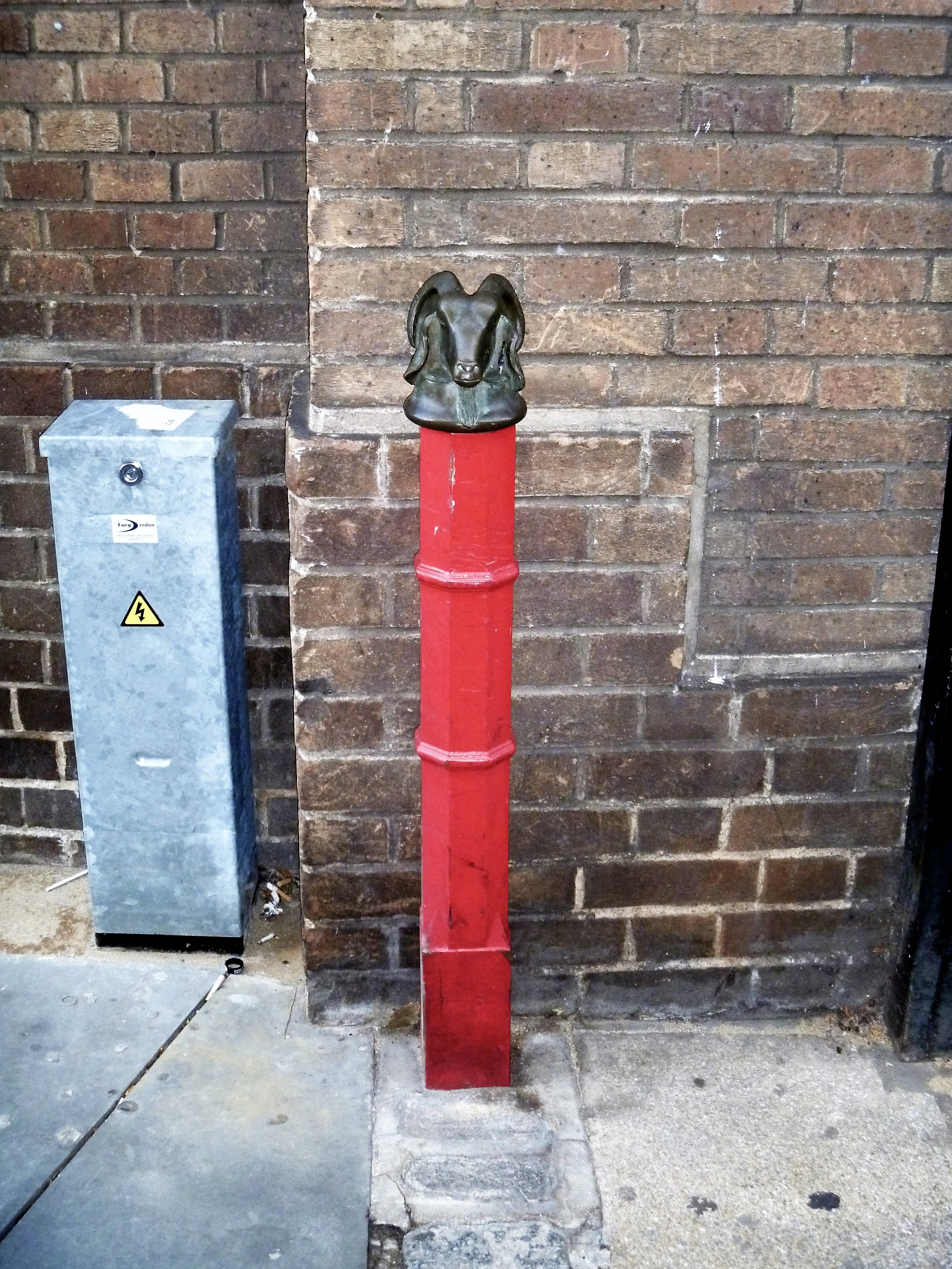
A Norwich Lanes bollard on Lower Goat Lane

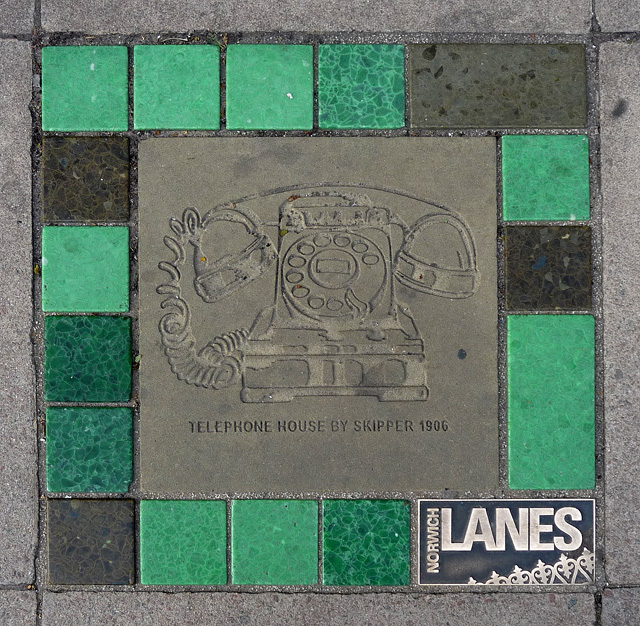
A Norwich Lanes paving slab on St Giles Street

The Norwich Lanes, known locally as The Lanes, is an area of Norwich, a city in Norfolk, England. It consists of a series of mostly pedestrian-oriented small lanes, alleyways and streets. Norwich Lanes is noted for its independent retailers, and eating and drinking establishments. The area also contains some of the city's cultural attractions, including museums, theatres, pubs and bars.

In 2007, Norwich University of the Arts graduate Sally Barrett designed a set of commemorative paving slabs for the Lanes, of which there are almost 50. The Lanes also feature several bollards with finials commissioned by Norwich City Council and sculpted by Oliver Creed in 2007. There are 12 different finial designs, either referencing the name of the street they sit in, such as a swan for Swan Street, or something of the area's history, such as a ram's head in the former horn working area. The bollards are painted "madder red" in reference to the dye used in Norwich's 17th century weaving trade.

As part of a nationwide drive to recognise the importance of the character and individuality of Britain's high streets, and to maintain it, Norwich Lanes won the Great British High Street Awards 2014 in the "City" category.
