= Veroli Casket =

Middle Byzantine casket

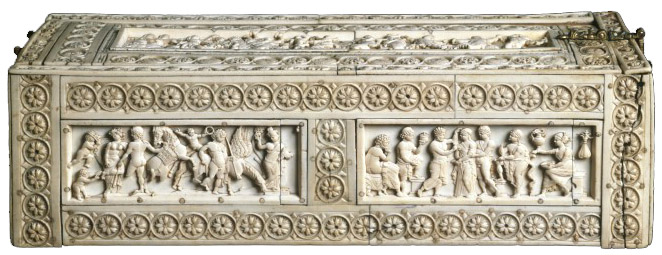
- Front side
- Material: Wood overlaid with carved ivory and bone plaques with traces of polychrome and gilding
- Size: Height: 11.5 cm Length: 40.3 cm Width: 15.5-16 cm Weight: 1.72 kg
- Created: Constantinople, 900–1000 AD
- Present location: Victoria and Albert Museum, London
- Identification: 216-1865

The Veroli Casket is a Middle Byzantine casket, probably made in Constantinople (now Istanbul) in the late 10th or early 11th century, and now in Room 8 of the Victoria and Albert Museum, London. It is thought to have been made for a person close to the Imperial Court of Constantinople, the capital of the Byzantine Empire, and may have been used to hold scent bottles or jewellery. It was later in the Cathedral Treasury at Veroli, south east of Rome, until 1861.

== Description ==
The casket's dimensions are: height: 11.5 cm, length: 40.3 cm, width: 15.5–16 cm, and weight: 1.72 kg. It is made of carved ivory and bone panels showing scenes from classical mythology. On the lid is a depiction of the Rape of Europa. On the front are scenes from the stories of Bellerophon and Iphigenia. On the back is part of a dionysiac procession, with two figures identified as Mars, god of war (the Greek Ares), and Venus, goddess of love (the Greek Aphrodite). The ends bear scenes of Bacchus, god of wine (the Greek Dionysius), in a chariot drawn by panthers, and a nymph riding a seahorse. There is a carcass of wood, metal fittings, and the lid is hinged.

As the Empire had been Christianised for centuries, these pagan motifs presumably represent a revived taste for classical style and imagery. The size and quality of the casket suggest it was made for someone in the inner court circle.

The casket from Veroli is one of some 43 caskets, in addition to dozens more separated panels, that show a fashion for "pseudo-antique motives derived from silver plate or manuscripts, put together with little understanding of the original significance," as Sir Kenneth Clark observed of the group as a whole, during the medieval eclipse of the nude. He wrote: "Between the nereids of late Roman silver and the golden doors of Ghiberti, the nudes in Mediterranean art are few and insignificant ... a few objets de luxe, like the Veroli Casket, with its strip-cartoon Olympus..." It is also one of the Byzantine type known as "rosette caskets" from the use of rows of carved rosettes in the sections outside the scenes with figures; the quality of the carving makes this "the finest" of the group.

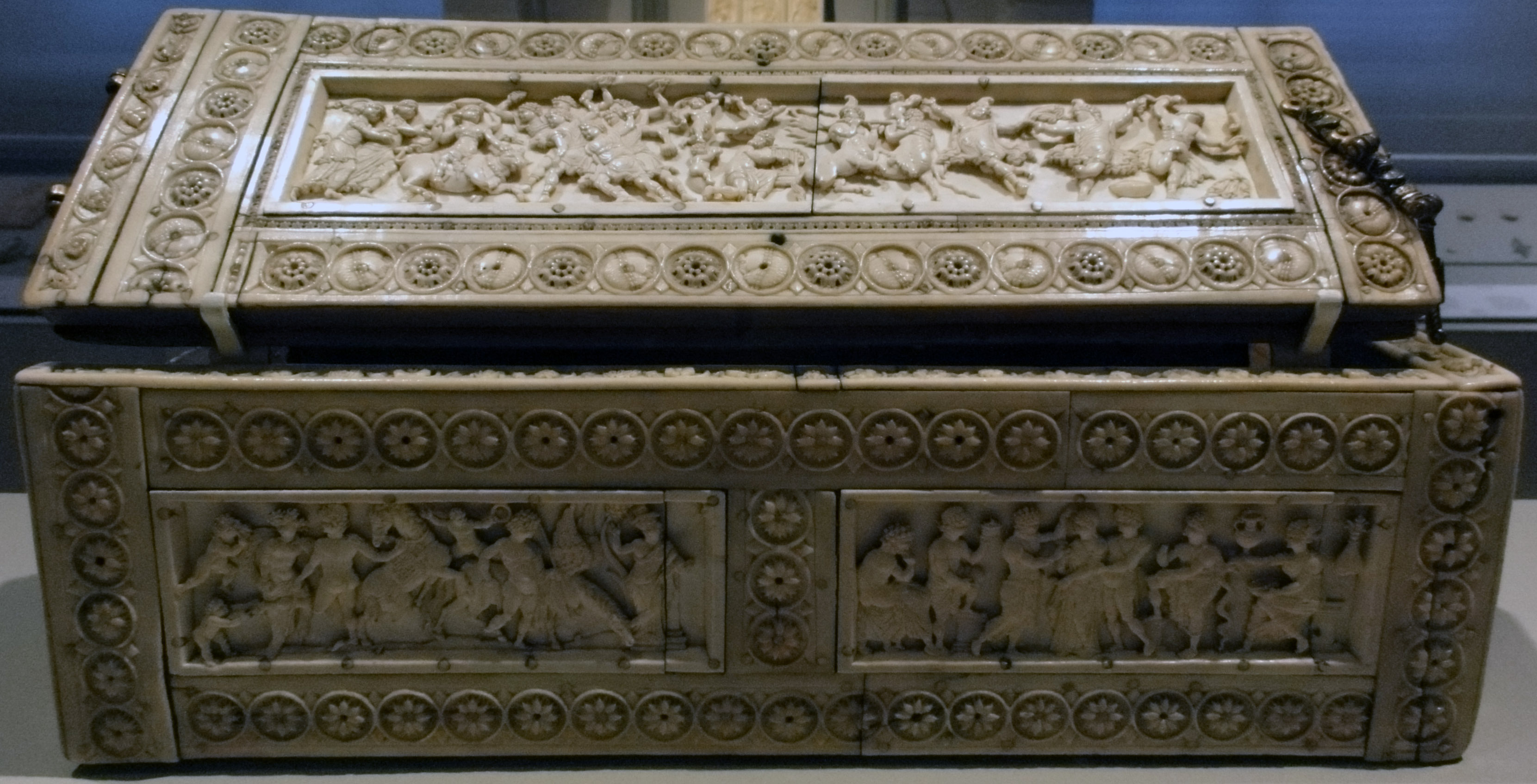
Alternative front view showing lid carving.

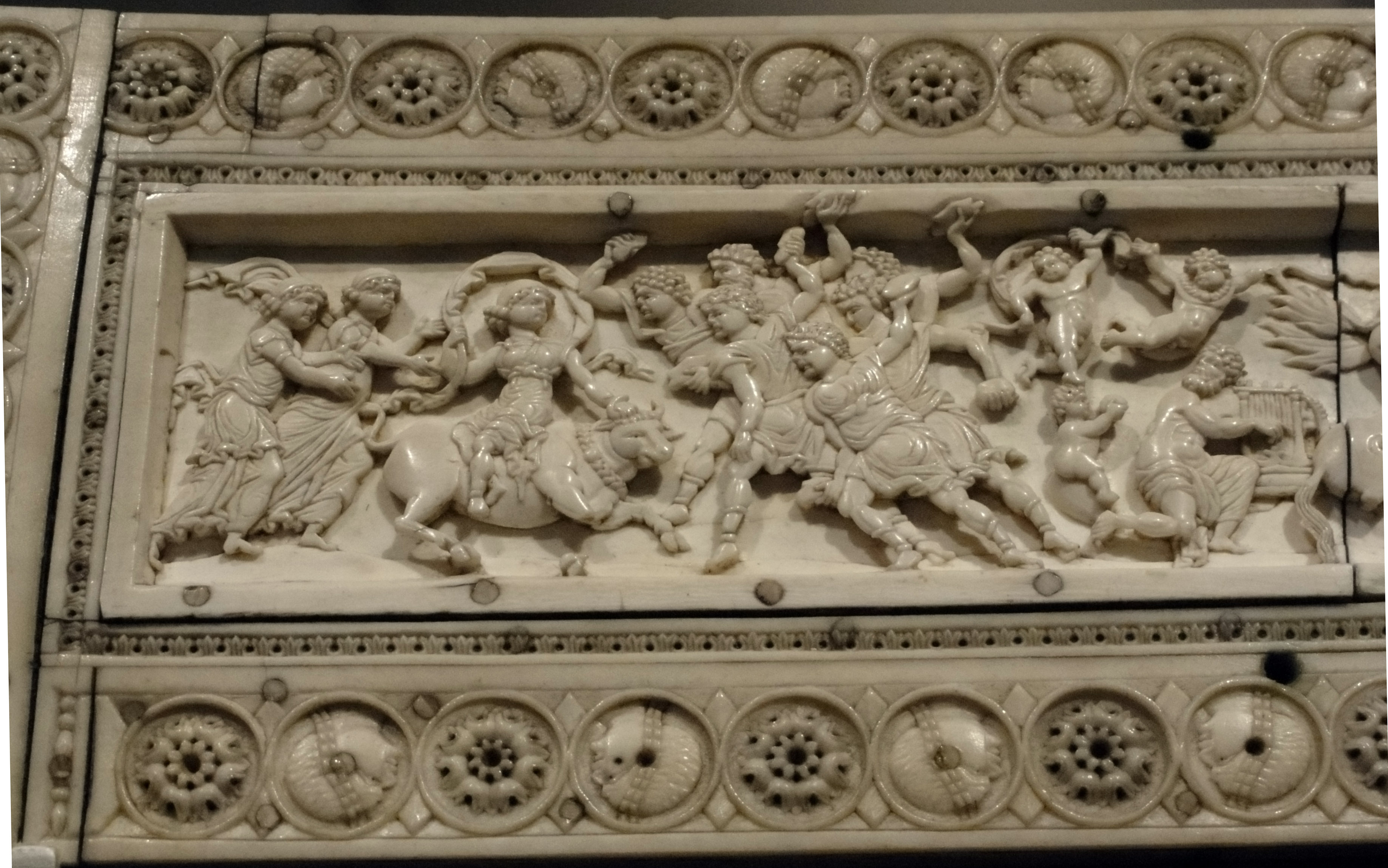
Lid detail showing the Rape of Europa with Jupiter as the bull (on the left) and Hercules playing the lyre (on the right).

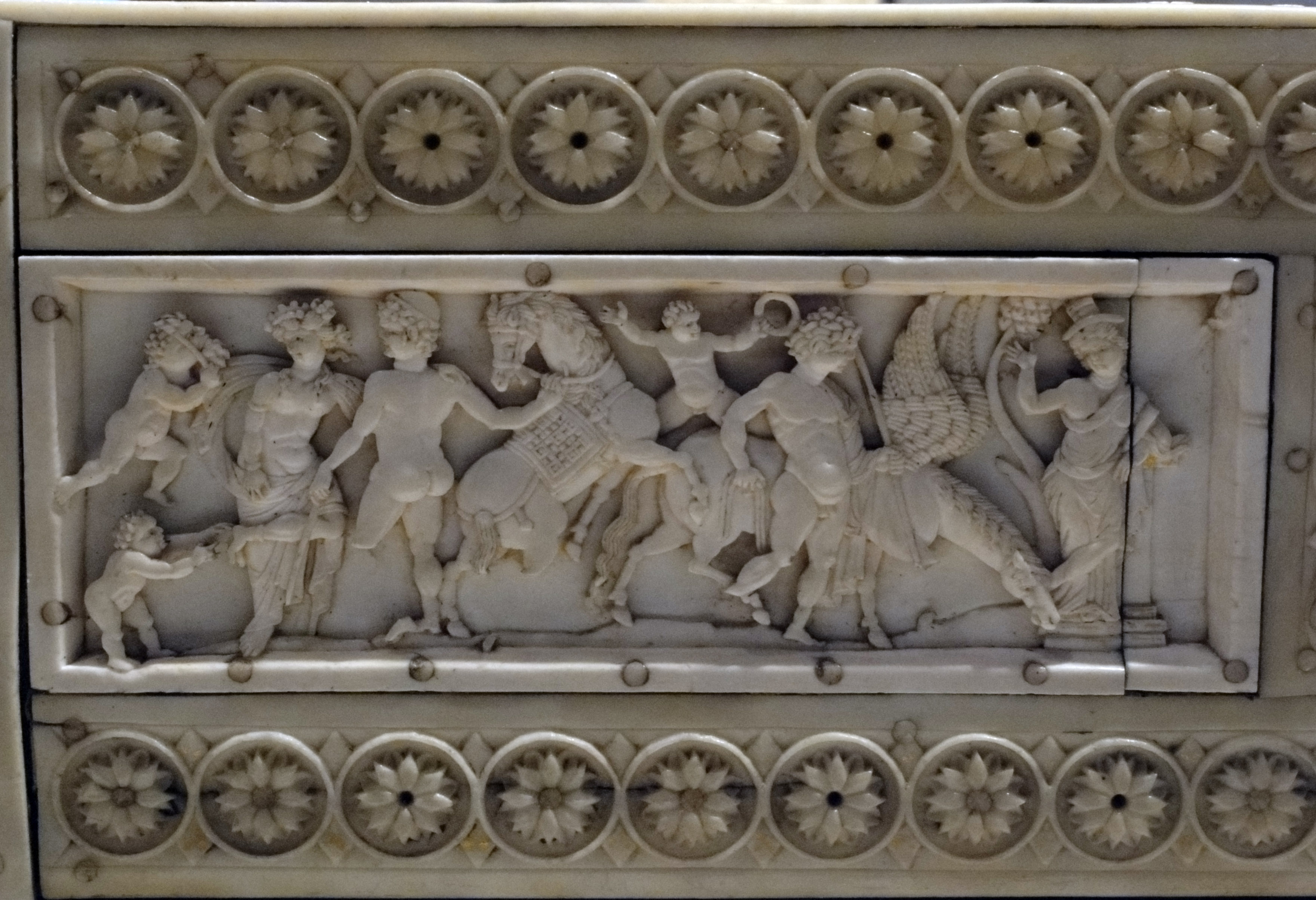
Panel detail with Bellerophon and Pegasus.

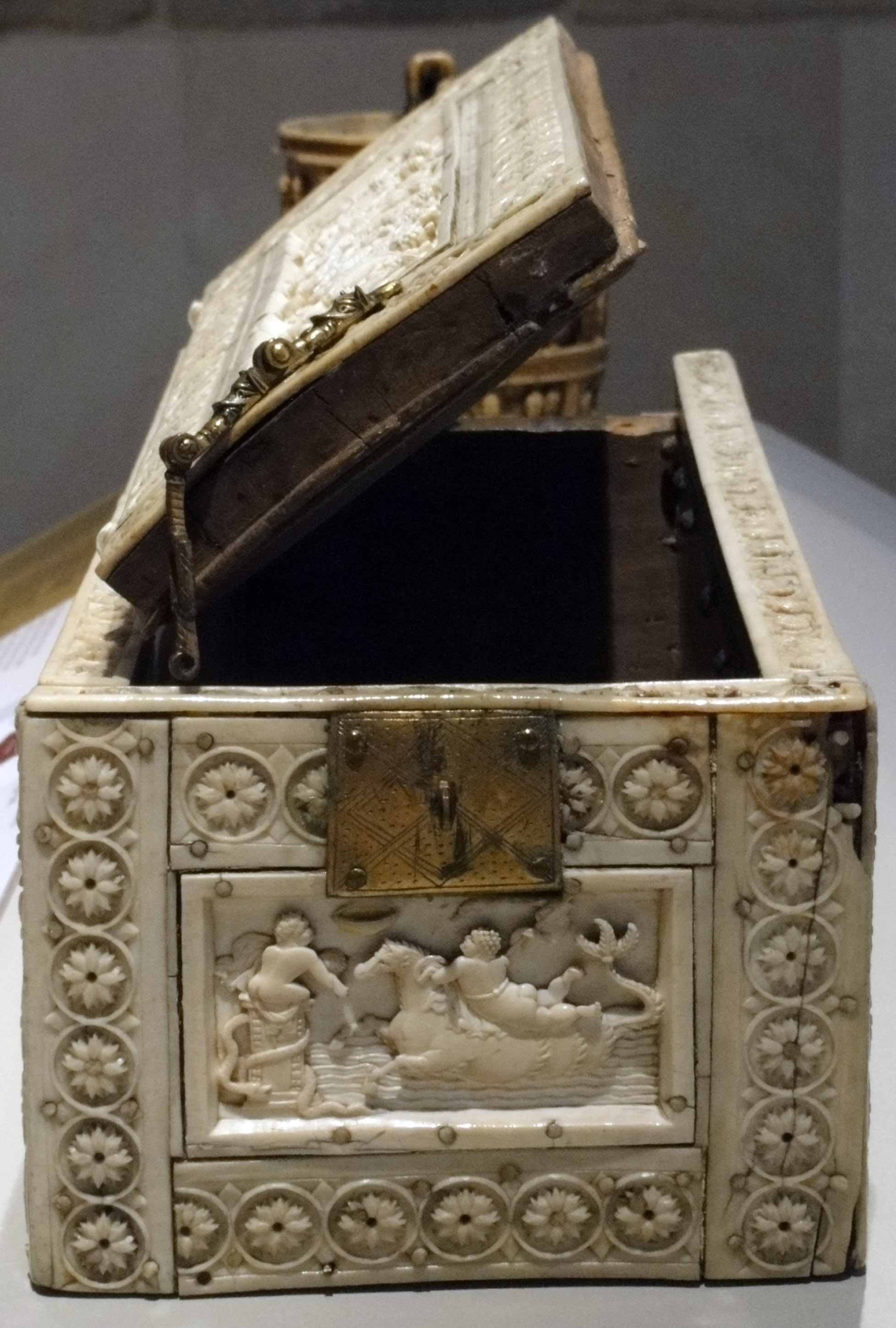
End view showing nymphs with seahorse.

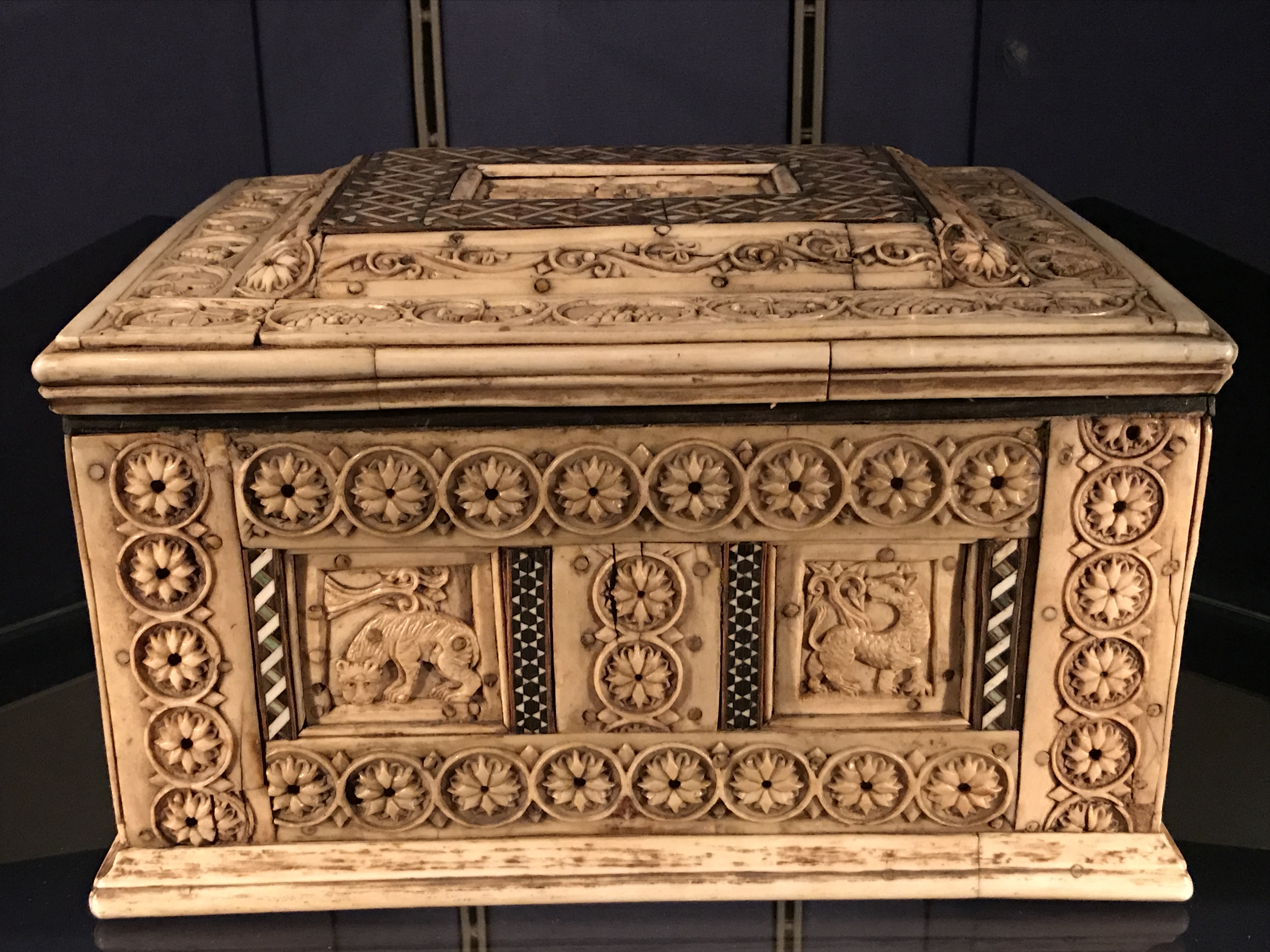
A different Byzantine rosette casket, 12th-century, wood
