= Certosina =

Renaissance-era decorative art technique

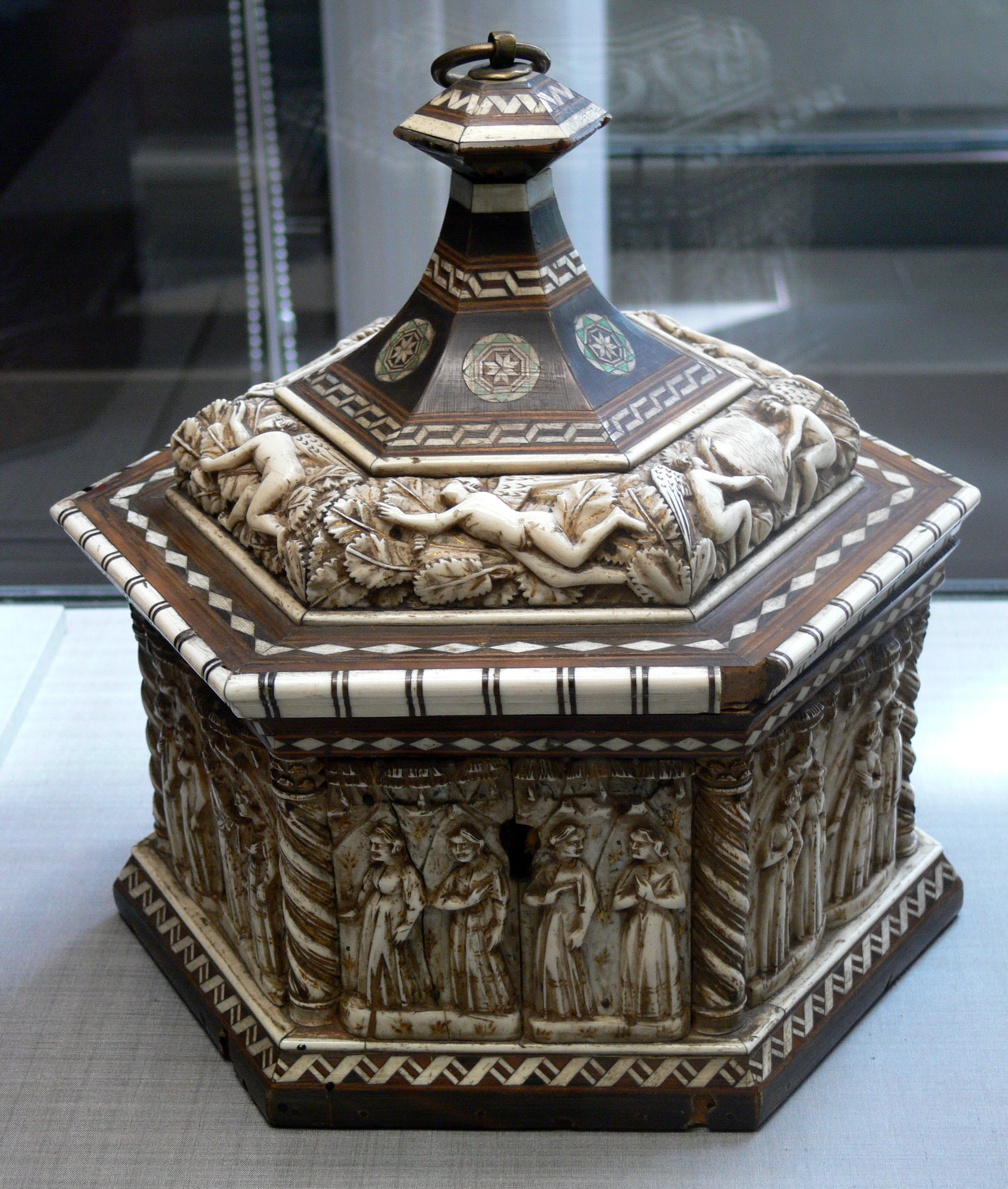
Certosina patterns around the larger carved bone panels in a casket by the Embriachi workshop

Certosina is a decorative art technique of inlaying used widely in the Italian Renaissance period. Similar to marquetry, it uses small pieces of wood, bone, ivory, metal, or mother-of-pearl to create inlaid geometric patterns on a wood base. The term comes from Carthusian monasteries (Certosa in Italian, Charterhouse in English), probably the Certosa di Pavia, where the technique was used in ornamenting an altarpiece by the Embriachi workshop.

== See also ==
- Intarsia
- Pietre dure
