= Knottekistje =

Frisian wedding casket

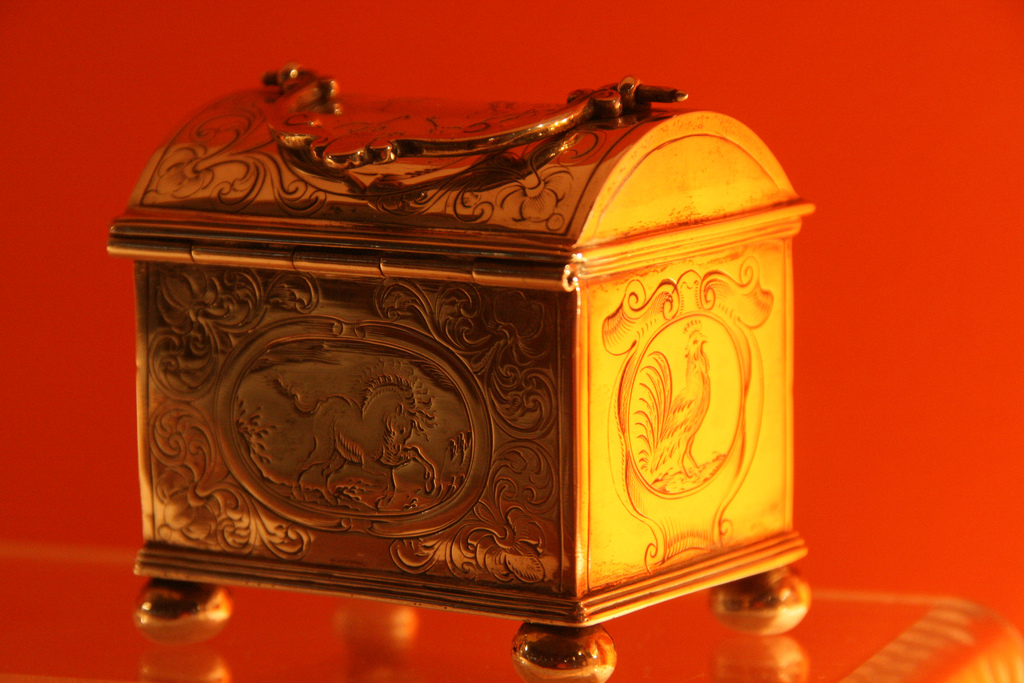
Silver knottekistje with pictures of people in 17th-century costumes - Dokkum (1700)

A knottekistje or wedding casket is a small Frisian money casket.

Apart from their content Knottekistjes are also valuable since in most cases they are made of silver. The boxes are rectangular with a semicircular lid and stand on ball feet. Frisian marriage caskets are delicately engraved with symbolic scenes about love and marriage, often accompanied by a proverb or motto.

== Folkloric Frisian tradition ==
The knottekistje belongs to a folkloric Frisian tradition. In the sixteenth century it was customary for a boy to offer a girl a coin when he asked her to marry him. If she accepted this coin, the couple could consider themselves engaged.

If one offered more coins, it was done in a cloth with a special knot: the so-called knotte or knottedoek (knott cloth). This knotte ('knot' in Frisian has the same meaning as in English) was 'loosely' knotted. If the girl drew the knot tighter, then her response was positive and they were engaged. With increasing prosperity the cloth was replaced with a silver casket, called knottekistje. The box and its contents remained the property of the wife and was also kept as a saving for a rainy day.

== Poem ==
While offering the following poem was pronounced by the boy:

Wotte ? sa wotte
Sa heste de knotte
Wost it net dwaen
Den kinst my de knotte werjaen

In English:

Do you want ? - If you want to
Then the knotte is yours
If you don't want to
Then you must return the knotte to me

== Literature ==
- Joost Hiddes Halbertsma, Letterkundige naoogst.
- Jacobus Scheltema, Volksgebruiken der Nederlanders bij het vrijen en trouwen
- Drs. C. Boschma, Friese en Noordhollandse knottekistjes, Antiek, mei 1969, 3e jaargang, nr 10.
- Asing Walthaus, Geen ring, maar een knottenkistje, Leeuwarder Courant, 4 September 2015.
- Haro Hielkema, Knottekistje voor een geliefde, Trouw, 4 December 2004.
