= Embriachi workshop =

Renaissance-era Italian producer of ivory and bone objects

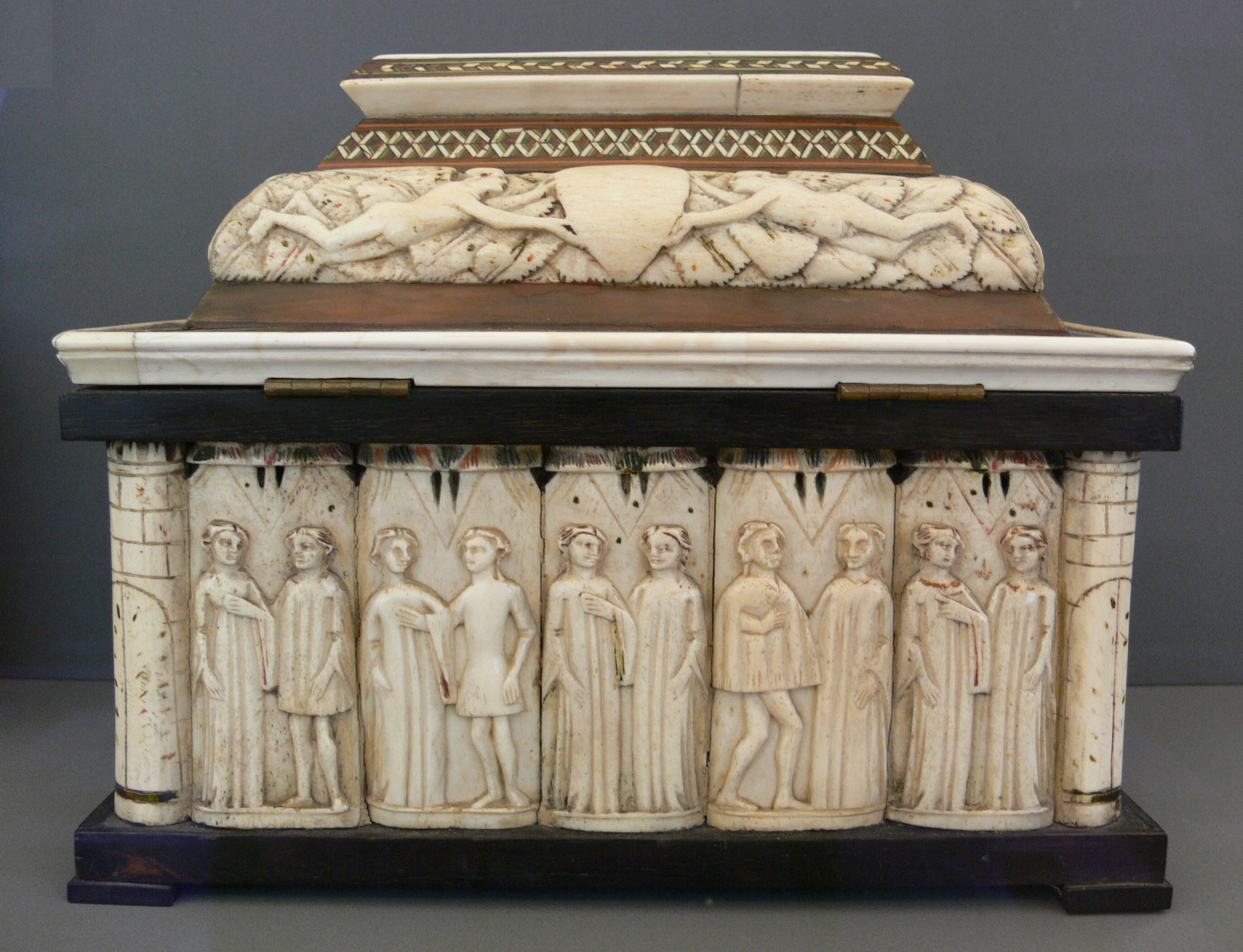
Casket with couples, traces of polychromy, certosina work and naked winged boys above

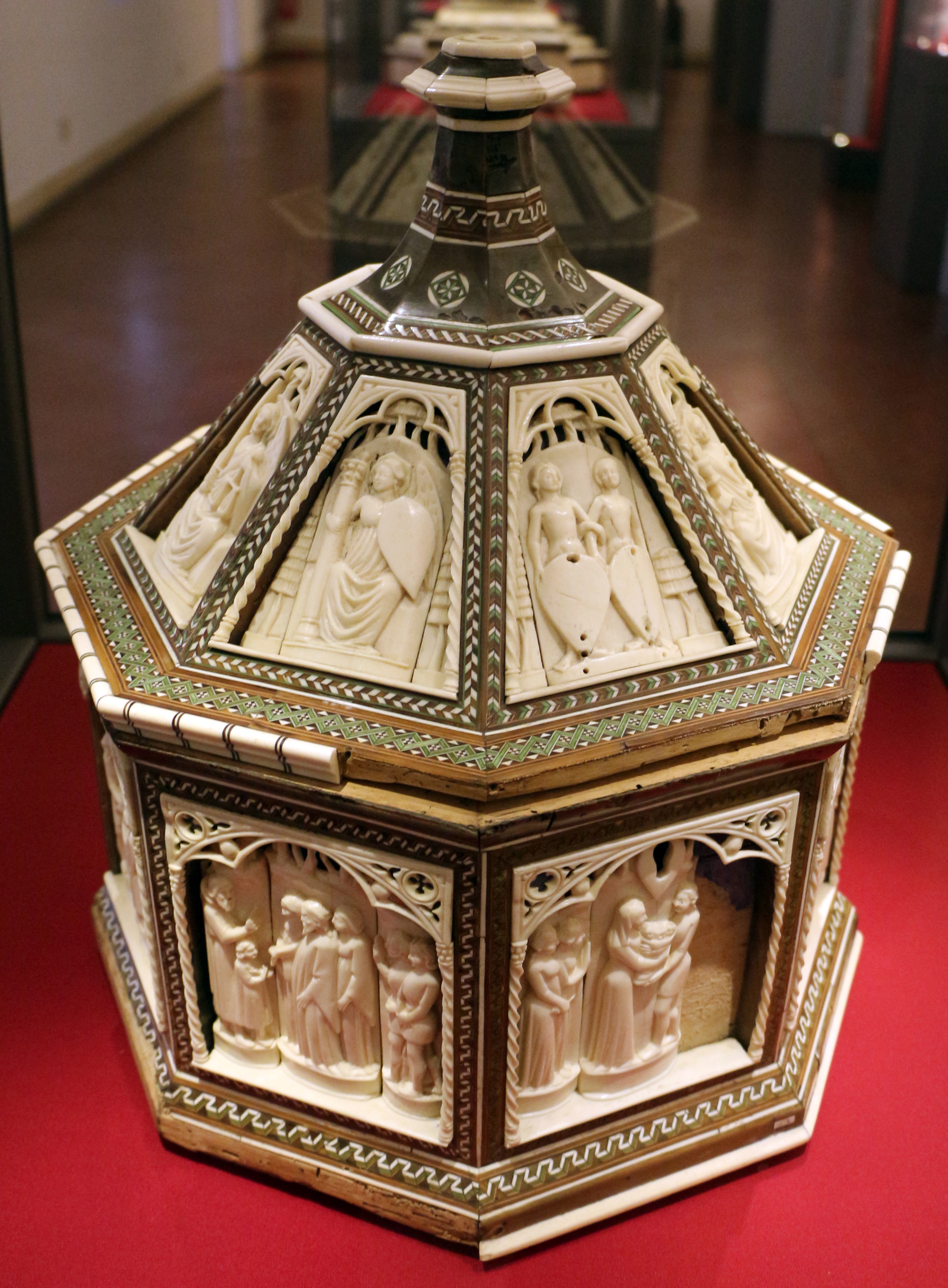
"Wedding casket", with certosina work, and missing parts showing wooden framework, c. 1390–1410

The Embriachi workshop (Italian: Bottega degli Embriachi) was an important producer of objects in carved ivory and carved bone, set in a framework of inlaid wood. They operated in north Italy from around 1375 to perhaps as late as 1433, apparently moving from Florence to Venice about 1395. They are especially known for what are now called marriage caskets or wedding caskets, hexagonal or oblong caskets about a foot across, with lids that rise up in the centre. Their output of these was probably made for stock rather than individual commissions, and filled a market for gifts for betrothals and weddings. They sold mirrors framed in a similar style, though fewer of these have survived, and religious pieces both small and in a few cases very large.

The workshop takes its name from Baldassare Ubriachi or Baldassare Embriachi, variously described as a nobleman, merchant and diplomat, or an "international man of business and politics". He was presumably not a carver himself, but supplied the capital, and no doubt was involved in negotiating the larger sales to courts and nobles north of the Alps; some documentary records of this survive. His two sons eventually carried on the business, also probably never carving anything themselves.

The great majority of works are undocumented and unsigned, and there were almost certainly other workshops working in the style, so the modern tendency among museums and art historians is to attribute them using "Embriachi workshop", "Embriachi-type" or similar terms. They are also very hard to date with any precision on stylistic grounds. Generally, the quality of carving tends to decline in works dated after about 1410. One scholar, Michele Tomasi, argues that the style of painted, rather than carved, elements of altarpieces suggests that production ceased around 1416.

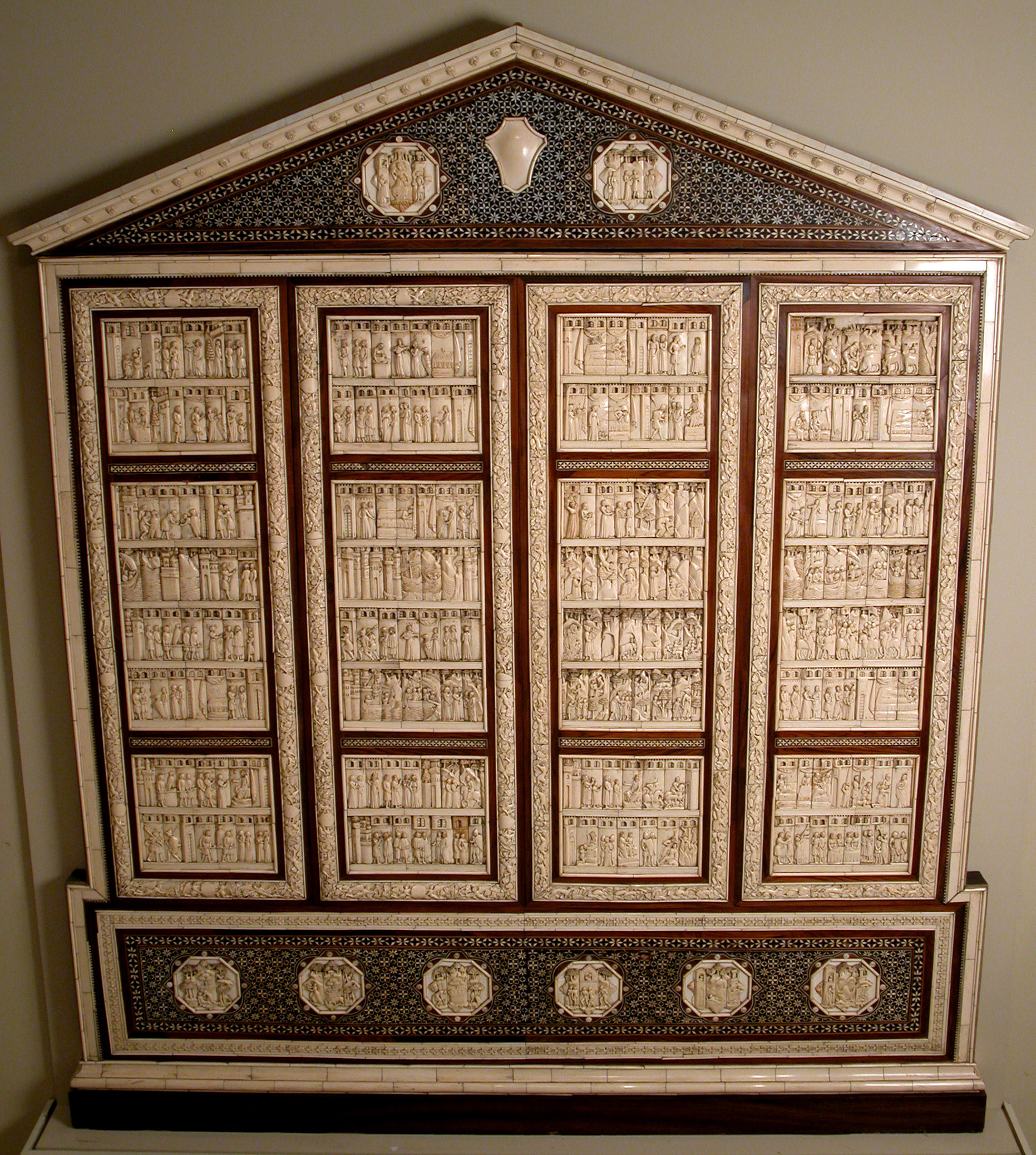
One of the Visconti panels now in the Metropolitan Museum of Art

The workshop developed a form of mass-production, with the various components produced separately for later assembly. The pieces of bone in particular were mostly carved as narrow tall panels containing one or two figures, which were set in rows along a face. A typical size for an individual plaque is about 10.2 cm high and 3.5 cm wide. Caskets and other objects normally have a framework of wood, and the areas not fitted with bone or ivory carving are decorated with certosina work, small geometrical inlays of various materials in contrasting colours. They are often called "marriage caskets", though their actual original context is hardly ever known.

== Marriage caskets, and other smaller pieces ==
Though the workshop was patronized by the richest and most style-conscious princes, much of its output of smaller objects was aimed at a much wider group of clients in the merchant and tradesman classes. These were generally decorated with secular subjects, often designed with female tastes in mind, as most were probably given as presents to women, especially as part of the donora of gifts to a bride-to-be.

The presentation of a marriage casket came after the conclusion of the legal and financial negotiations for a wedding between affluent families, but before the marriage itself. It was made the occasion of a certain amount of ceremony, as part of a symbolic courtship, carried to the bride's house and presented on the groom's behalf by a small child, and at that point containing symbolic gifts such as a girdle (elaborately decorated belt) representing virginity.

Scenes from medieval romance literature and, less often, classical mythology are seen, and also generalized and rather decorous pairs of couples or lovers, "couples in conversation, in codified stances full of restraint". The lids of secular caskets may feature personifications of the Virtues. There are also religious subjects, some following the formulae of the Parisian ivory workshops that dominated ivory carving, with triptychs for private devotion. These follow the conventional religious iconography of the period.

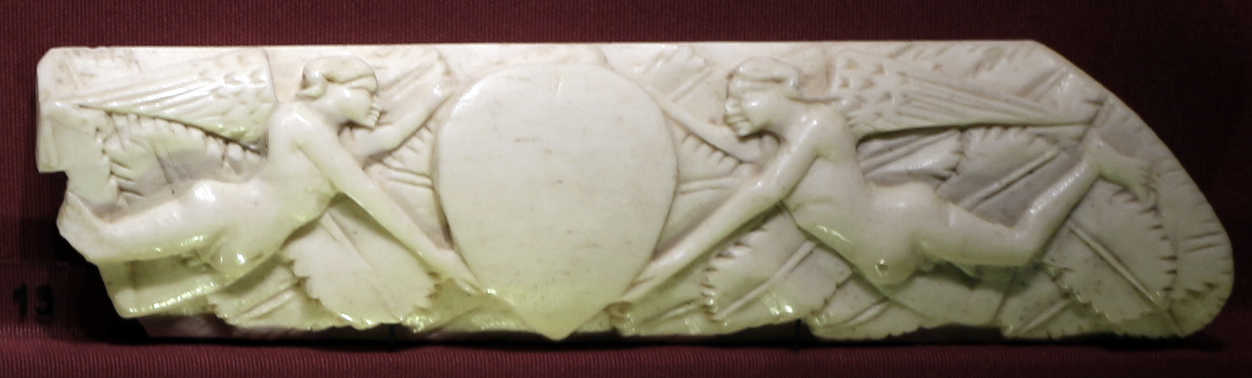
Loose panel with winged boys

The main images are made up of vertical panels, most with one or two standing figures each, arranged in a row. There is often a secondary zone of panels arranged horizontally with distinctive figures, usually naked males with wings, set on a background of large leaves, usually rose leaves. These often run round the lid of caskets, or the frames of mirrors. In some religious works they wear long gowns and can be understood as angels, but in most works they are rather grown-up putti, or winged "victories".

Pieces where the painted colours have not been cleaned away by later dealers suggest that relatively sparing gilding and painting of highlights was typical, but some pieces may never have received additional decoration in colour. Shields commonly feature, but are not carved with heraldry; this may have been intended to be painted after purchase. The lids often have hinges (perhaps not all original) and are decorated on the underside, and there is often a lock. Many caskets, especially the rectangular ones, have or had metal carrying handles at the top.

== Production ==
The name of the workshop's leading carver, Giovanni di Jacopo, is known; he was apparently in charge of day-to-day management. He also moved to Venice, where he made a will in 1404. The "workshop" probably operated at several locations, with the essentially separate skills of carving the bone plaques, making the wooden framework and certosina elements, and assembling the final casket very likely done at different places.

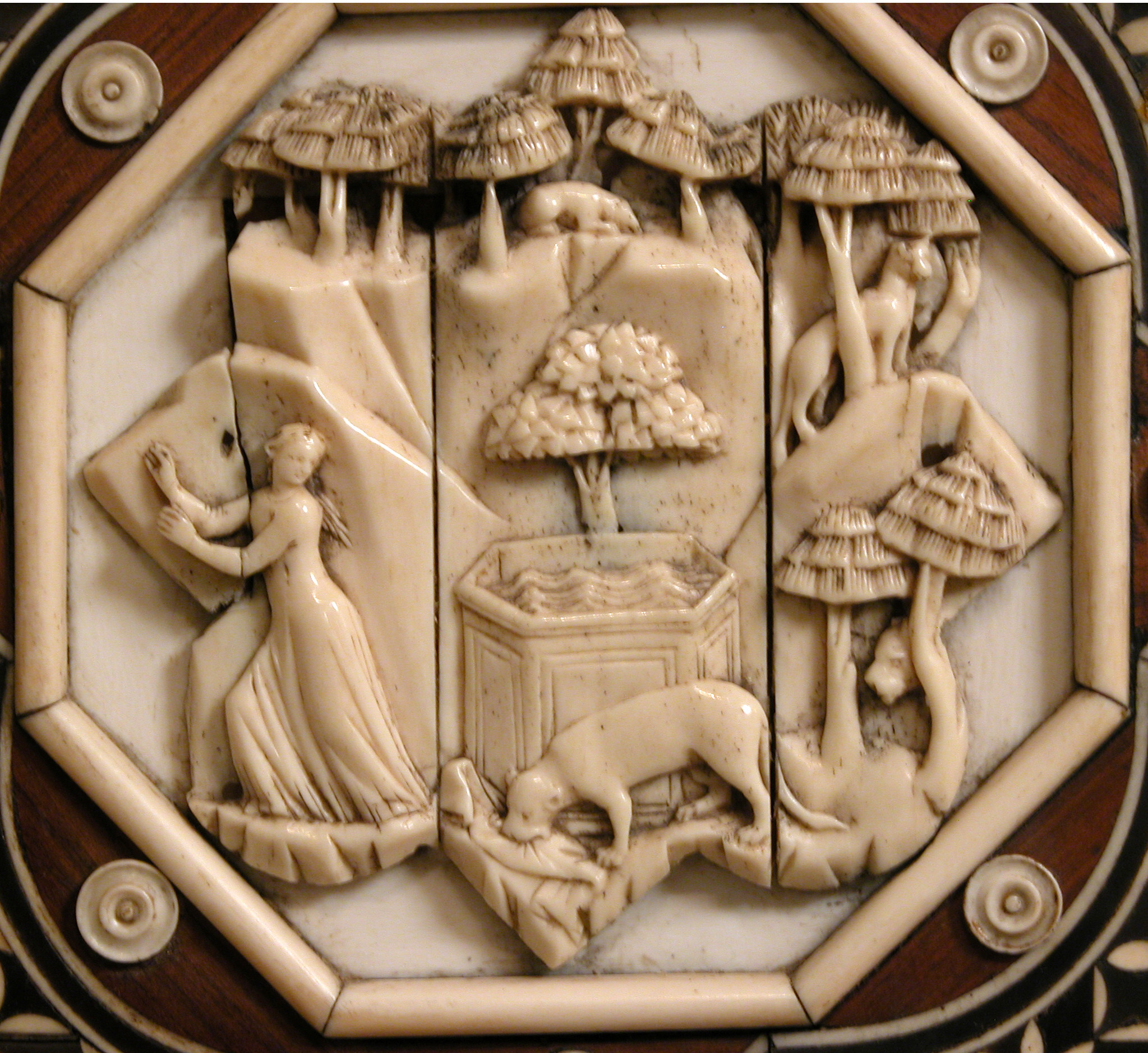
Panel from the Visconti Pavia chests, now in New York

Most carved panels, even in the largest prestige commissions, are of bone, apparently mostly from horses and cows, with horns and hoofs also used, but some are "ivory", which is mostly from the teeth of the hippopotamus. African elephant ivory had become even more rare and expensive than previously in Europe at this time. Inventories record the possession of bone mirrors by both Giovanni di Bicci de' Medici (d. 1429) and his great-grandson Lorenzo de' Medici (d. 1490), though both could easily have afforded ivory.

Scholarly attempts to identify workshops or artists working in the style have led to proposed groups such as the "Nailed Coffer" and "Story of Susanna" workshops.

The fairly standard size of the bone pieces with figures has allowed many surviving works to be reassembled and improved by later dealers, combining panels from different pieces to fill missing spaces, at the price of making the original iconography often unclear.

== Large works ==
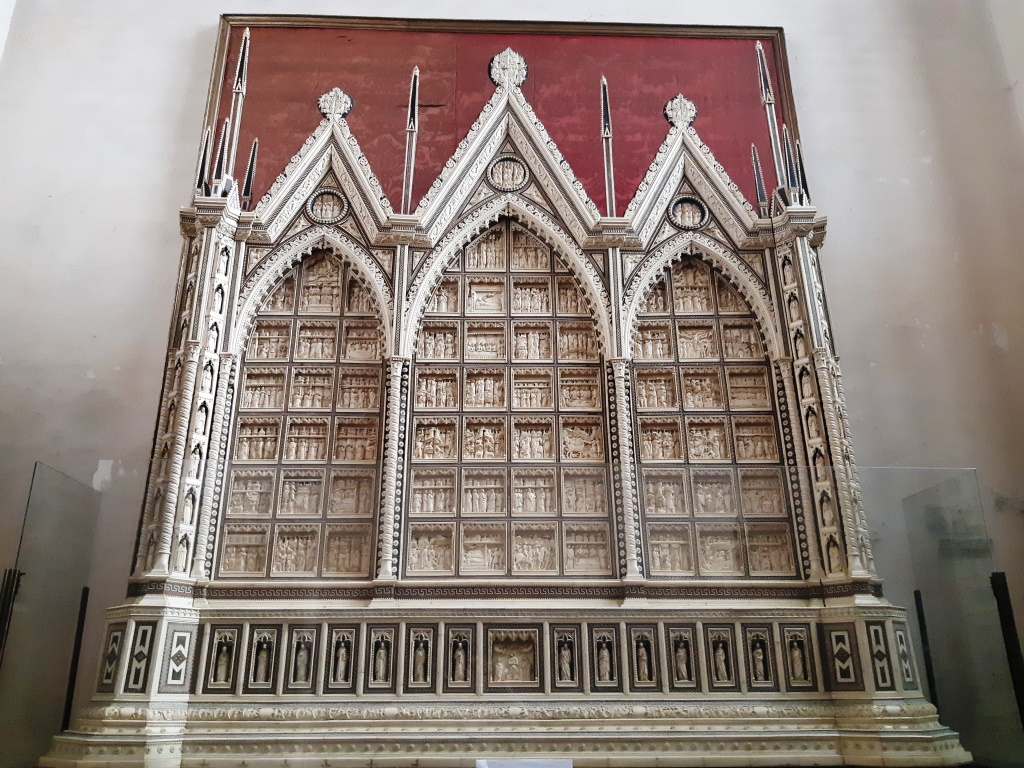
Altarpiece in the Certosa di Pavia, before 1409

A small surviving group of relatively large reredos altarpieces and other large pieces are relatively well-documented. The Visconti family, rulers of Milan, commissioned an altarpiece that remains in the Certosa di Pavia, an extravagant monastery the Visconti built to use as their family burial place. Other similar large religious pieces for the courts of France and Burgundy are confidently attributed to the same workshop on stylistic grounds.

Another important work was commissioned by the Certosa as chests for their Visconti benefactors to use for clothes and belongings in their room at the monastery. It no longer has this form; after extensive rearrangements in the 18th and 19th centuries there are now two groups of carved bone panels set in a framework for display, which are now in the Metropolitan Museum of Art in New York, donated by John Pierpont Morgan, whose collections also included several Embriachi caskets.

Some parts from other pieces seem to have been used for the current configuration, which may contain parts from as many as five original works. The subjects are secular, stories from various romances, including Il Pecorone (The Golden Eagle) and classical mythology. The current presentation does not seem to respect their original sequence, leading to much modern scholarly debate, and it is estimated that additional parts were added to give a total of five original objects used as sources for the current array. The price for the chests, paid by the monastery to Baldassare Ubriachi, was 1,000 gold florins, an "astronomical sum". Payments for this are documented between 1400 and 1409.

A third large work was commissioned by the French prince Jean, Duke of Berry for the priory at Poissy around 1400; it is now in the Louvre. It is broadly similar to the Pavia altarpiece, with scenes in bone from the lives of Christ, John the Baptist and John the Evangelist, as well as saints and donor portraits of the duke and his second duchess. It measures 276 cm by 236 cm.

== Baldassare Ubriachi ==
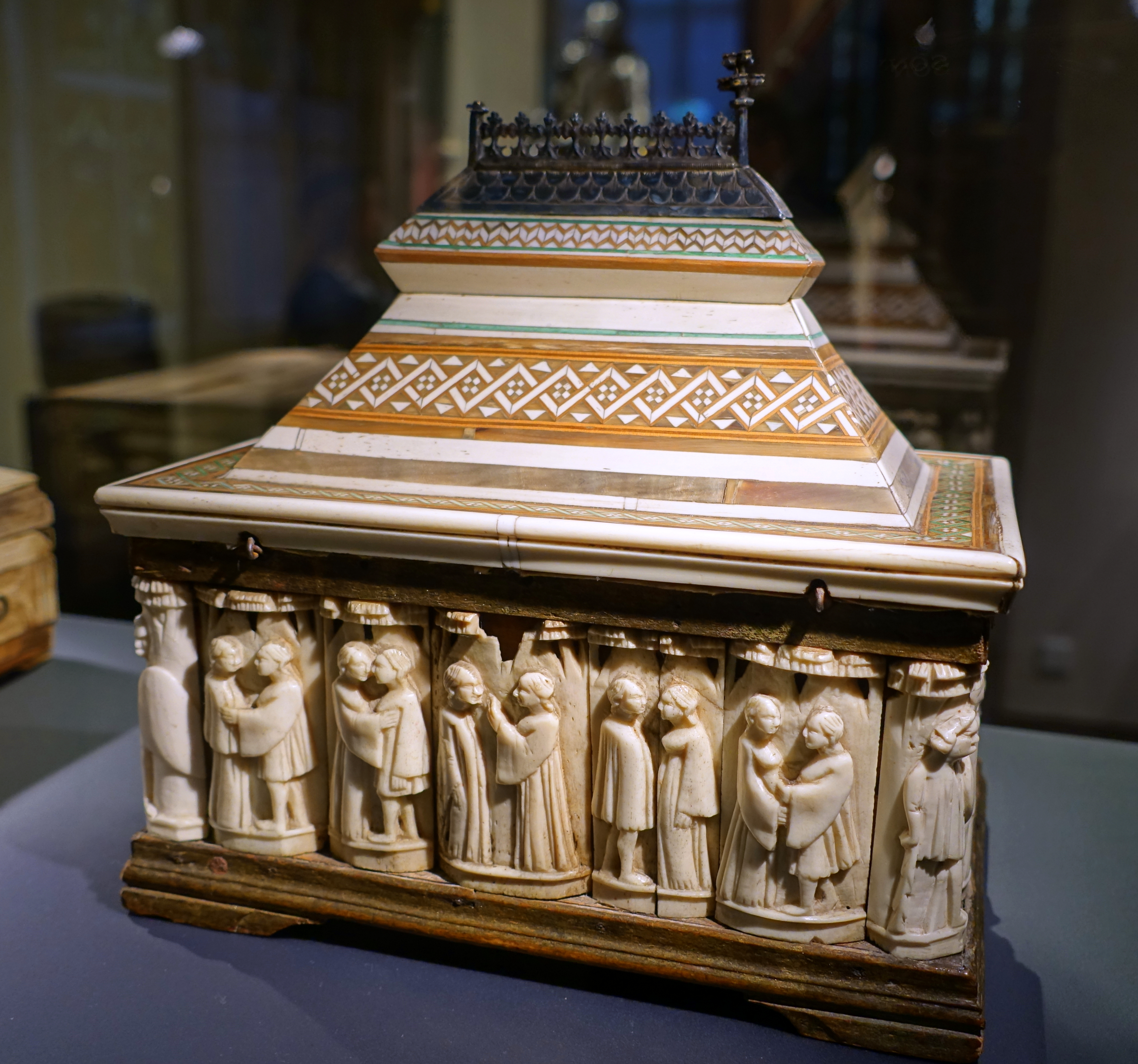
Casket with couples, and metalwork top

Baldassare Ubriachi was originally a Florentine, though he traced his descent to the Embriaco family of Genoa, who were distinguished military and political leaders in the Crusader Kingdoms from around 1100 to the late 13th century. He was involved in a number of areas of business, including trading jewels, money management and diplomacy for the Visconti of Milan, dukes of Milan, as well as the bone and ivory carving workshop.

Charles IV, Holy Roman Emperor made him a count palatine in 1369 for his work buying jewels for the emperor. In 1379 Charles' successor Wenceslaus IV of Bohemia had an Embriachi-type marriage casket containing relics walled-up in the Sigismund Chapel of St. Vitus Cathedral in Prague, where it was recovered in 1918. The themes of the carvings were secular, indeed mildly erotic, but this did not prevent its use as a reliquary, though one not on public view. Martin I of Aragon similarly gave a secular casket to Barcelona Cathedral in 1405 for use as a reliquary.

Baldassare Ubriachi moved to Venice "soon after 1390", where another branch of the family was already settled, having been exiled from Florence in the political upheavals of the late 13th century. The move may have been forced by financial difficulties in Florence; his sons-in-law took legal action to get their dowries paid as promised. He apparently took the workshop with him. He died there in 1406. The family are recorded there until 1431.

== Gallery ==
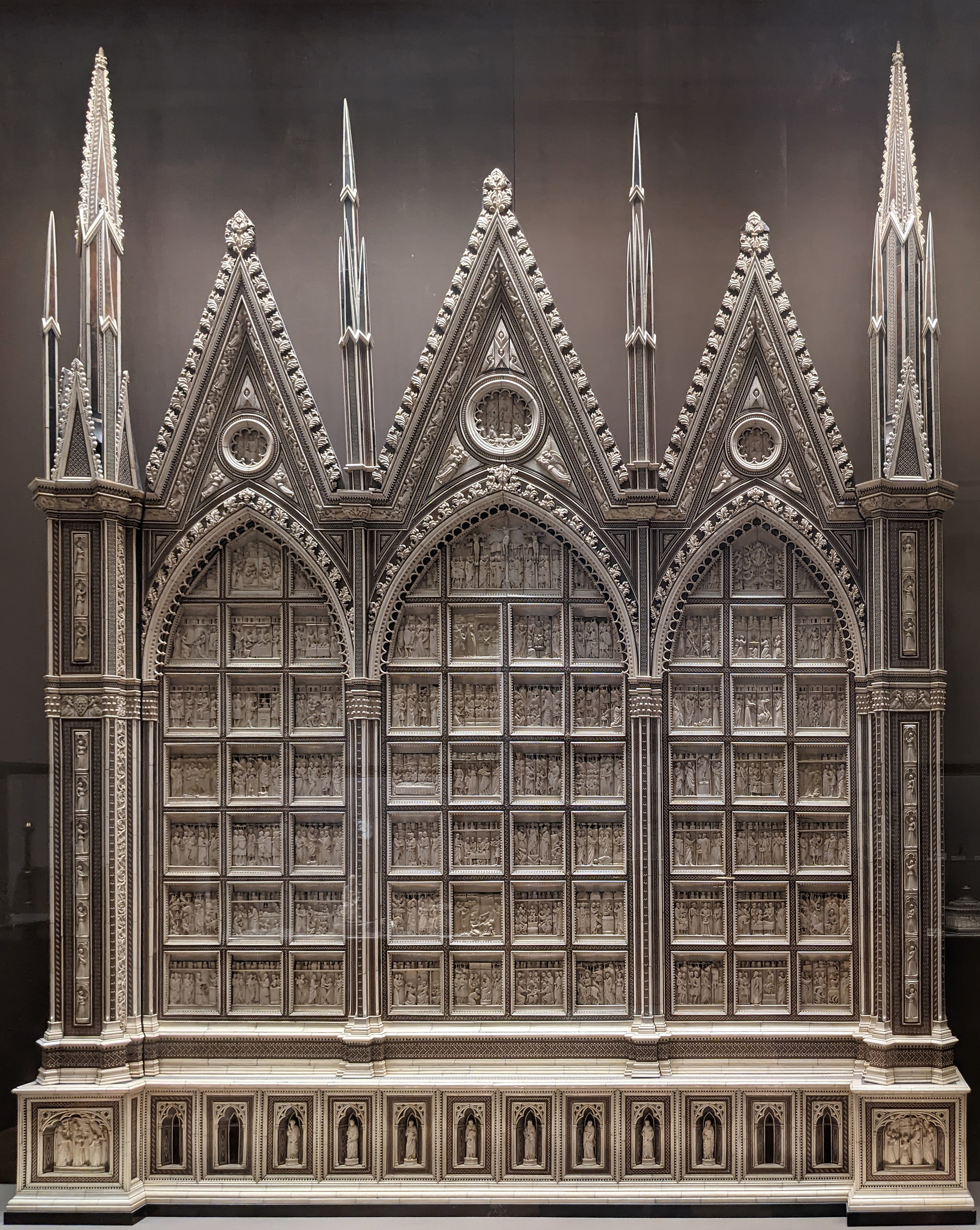
the Poissy retable in the Louvre; 276 cm by 236 cm

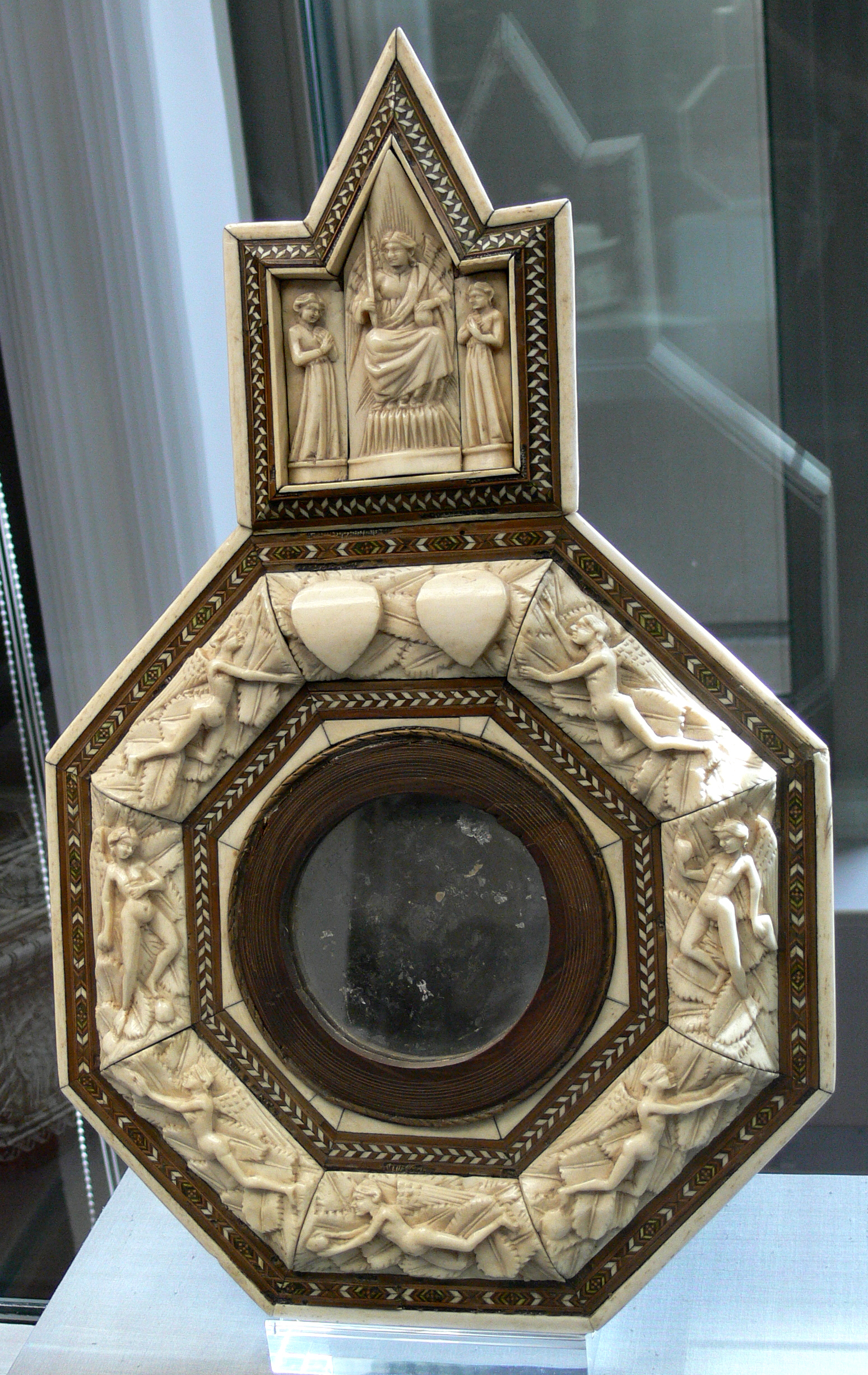
Mirror

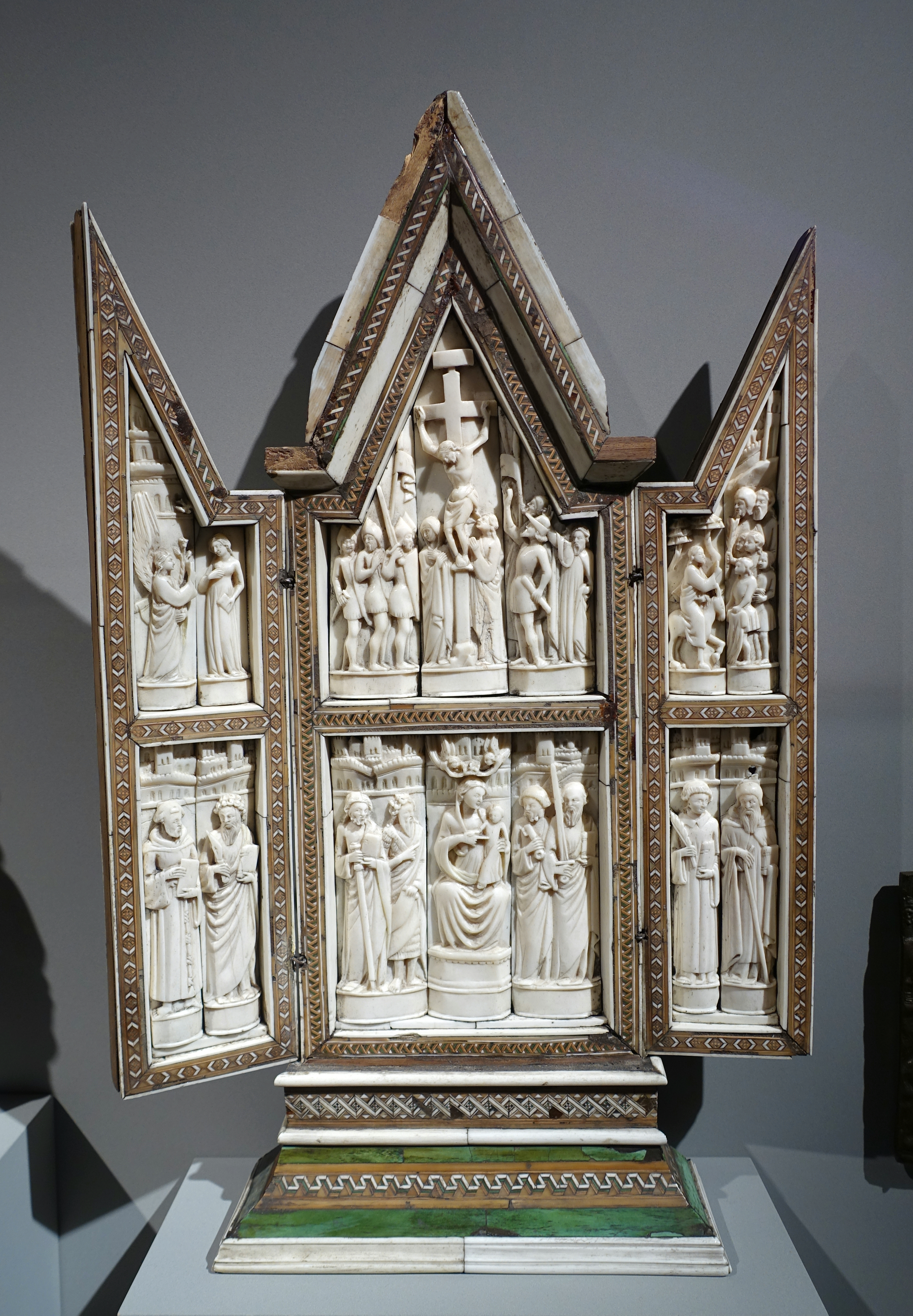
Small religious triptych in bone, early 15th century

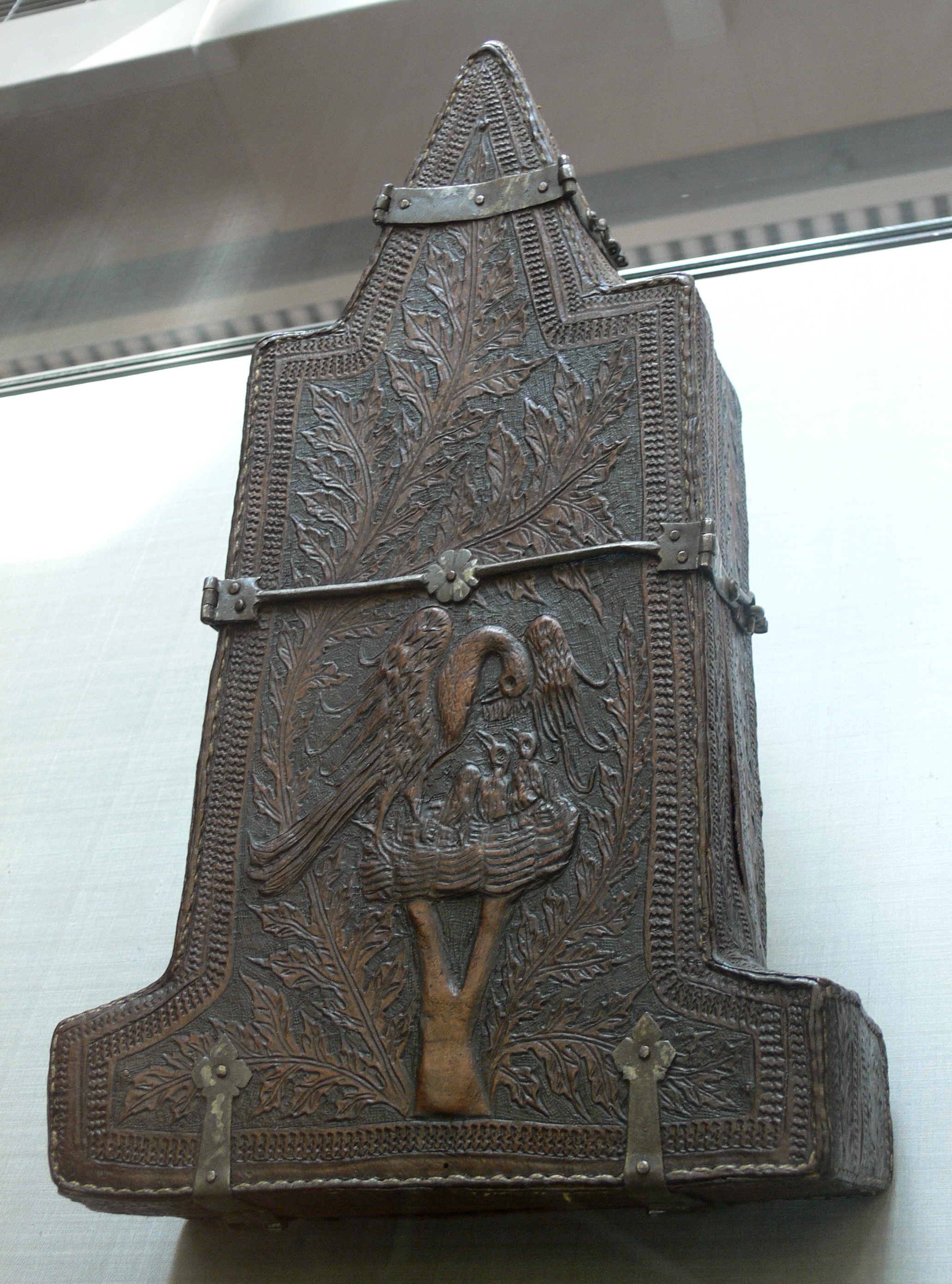
Boiled leather travelling case for the last

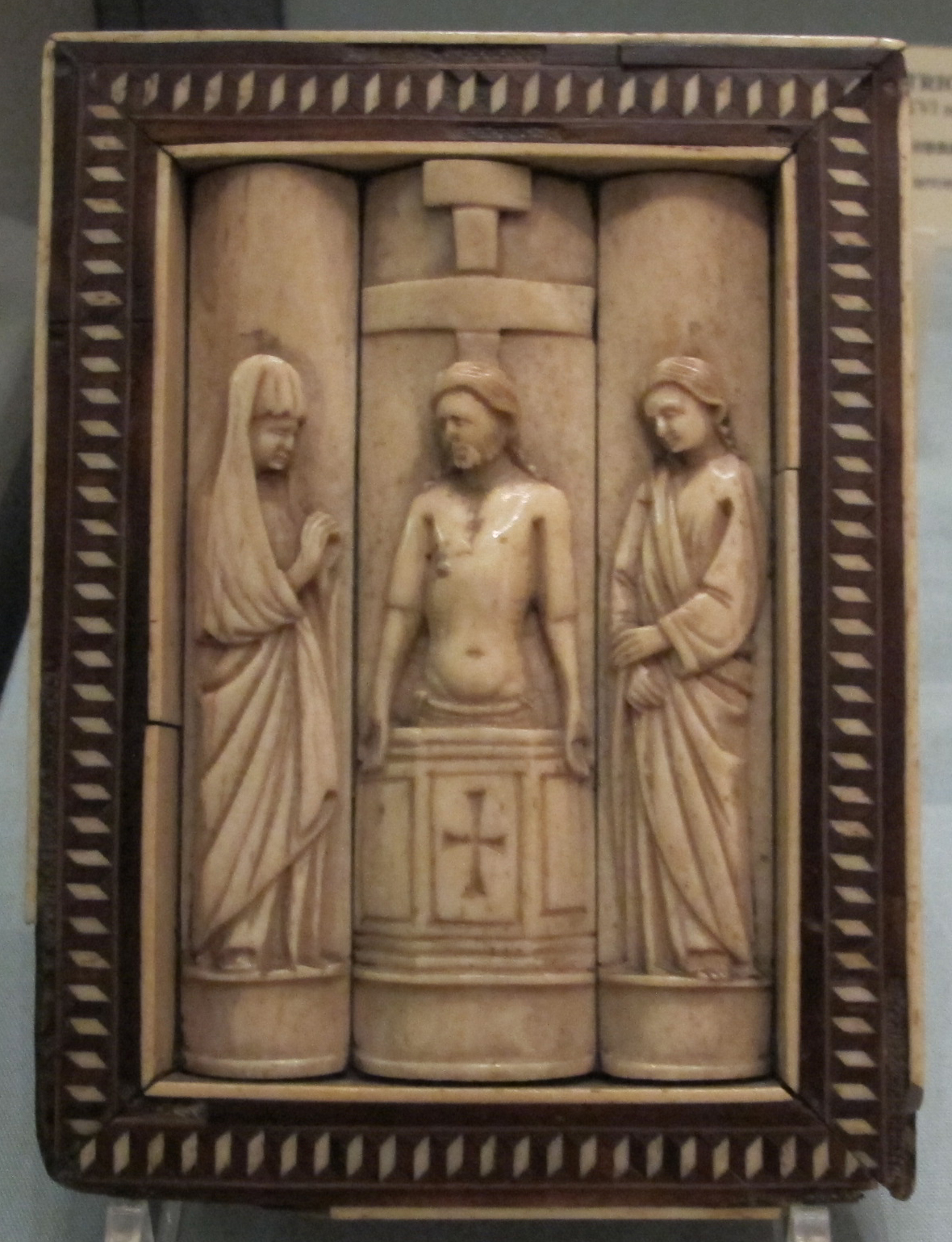
Pietà, late

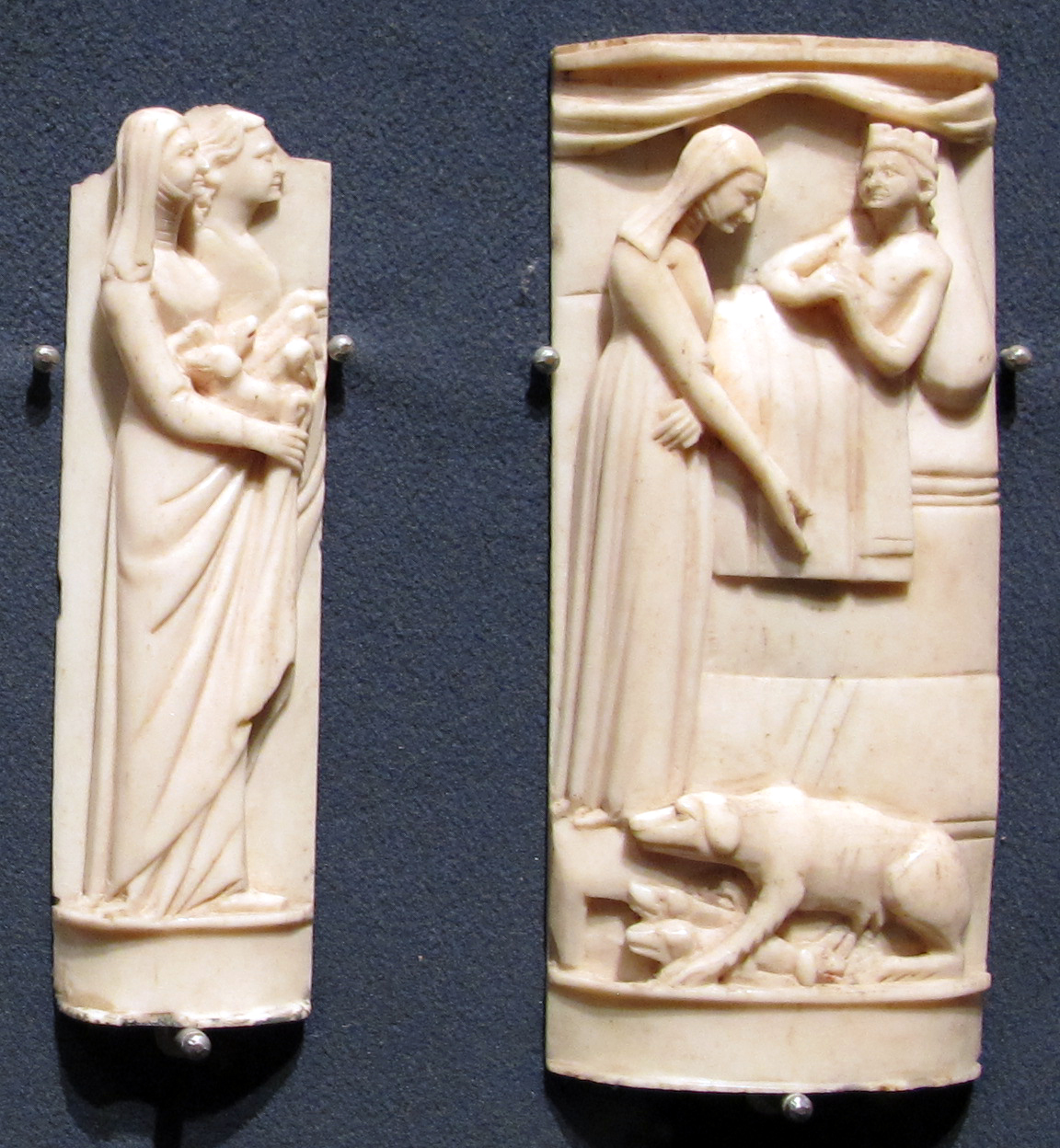
Elements from the Mattabruna story, late.

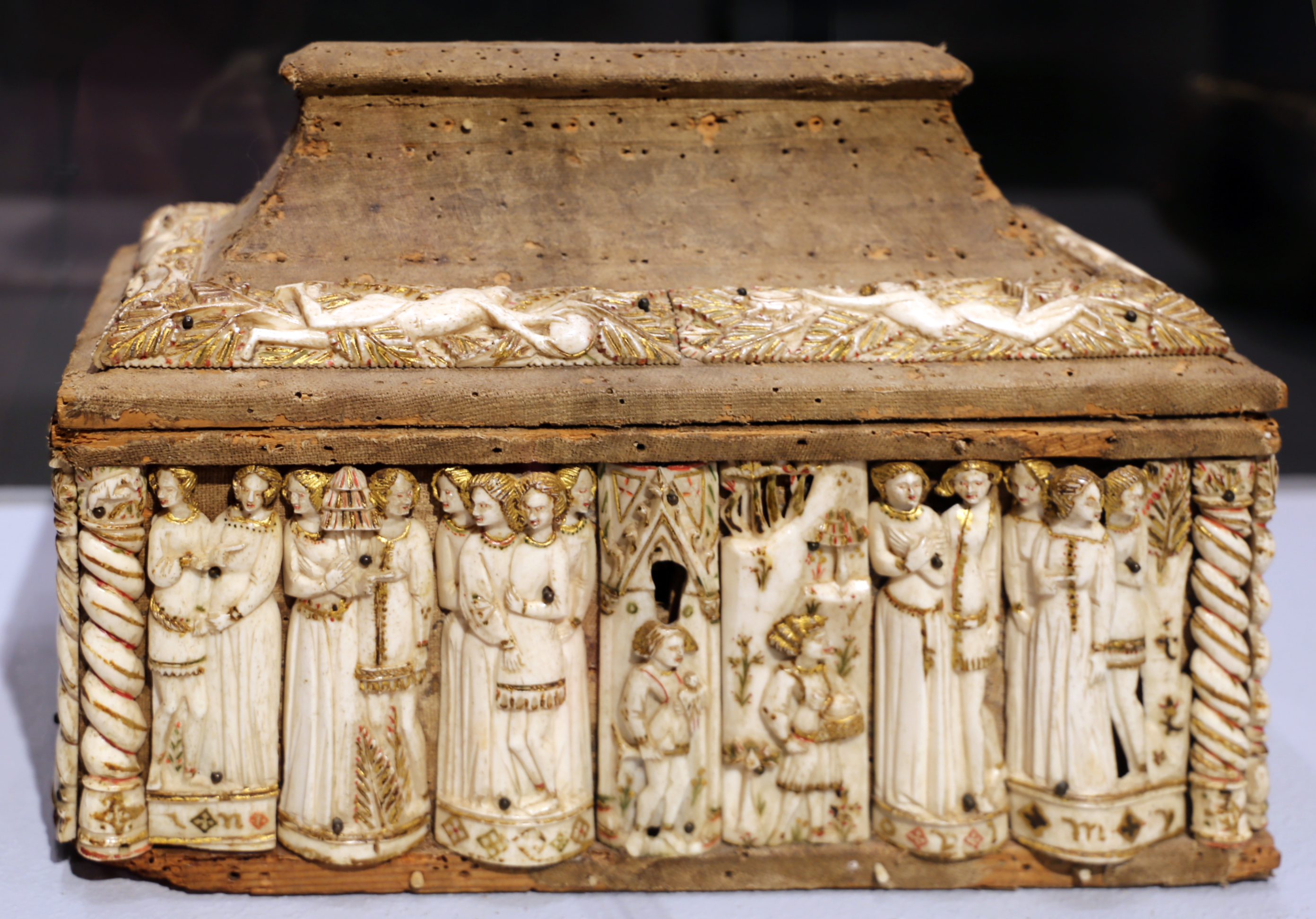
Casket with lock, surviving gilding, and red and green paint

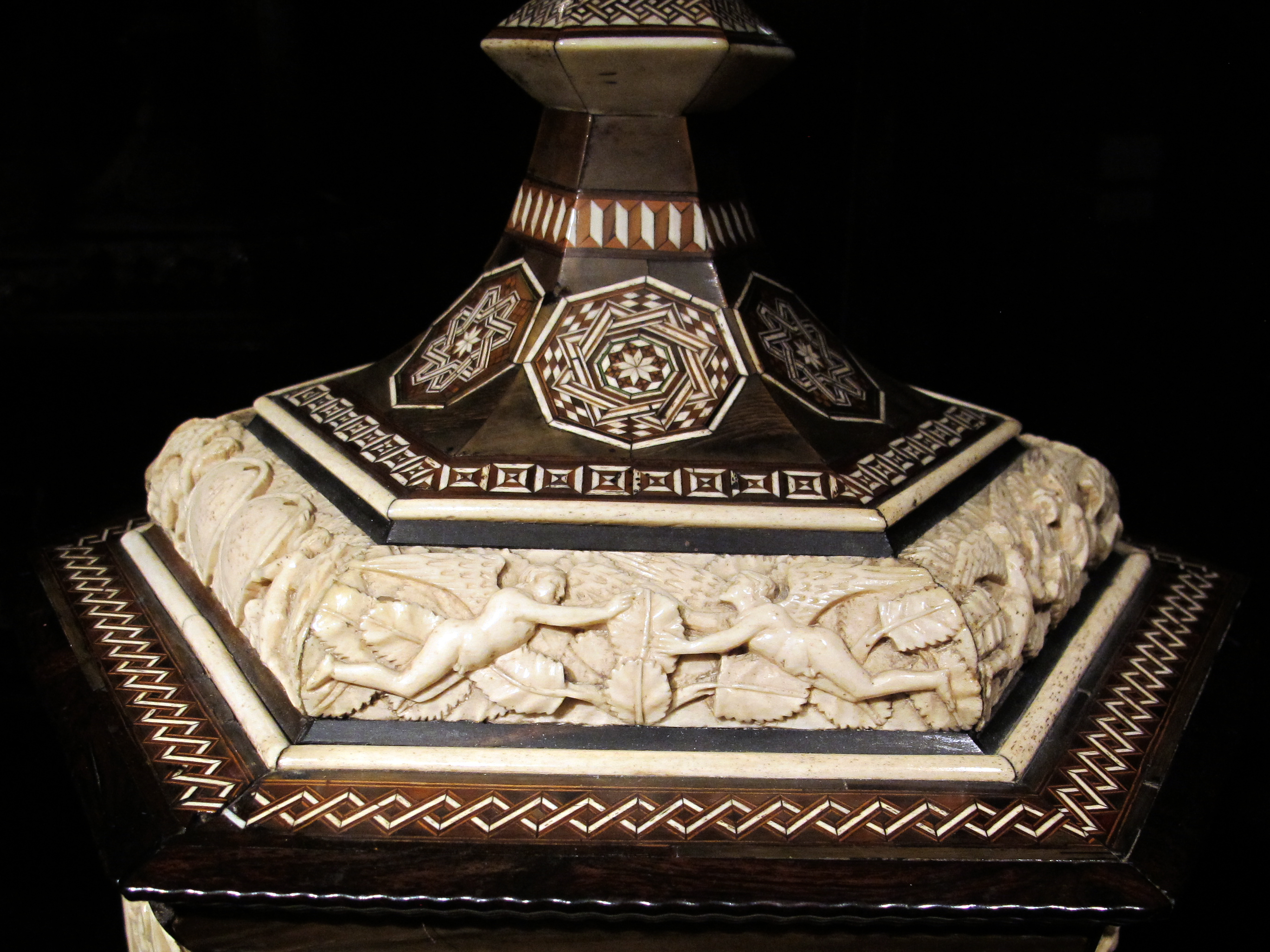
Casket lid with winged boys

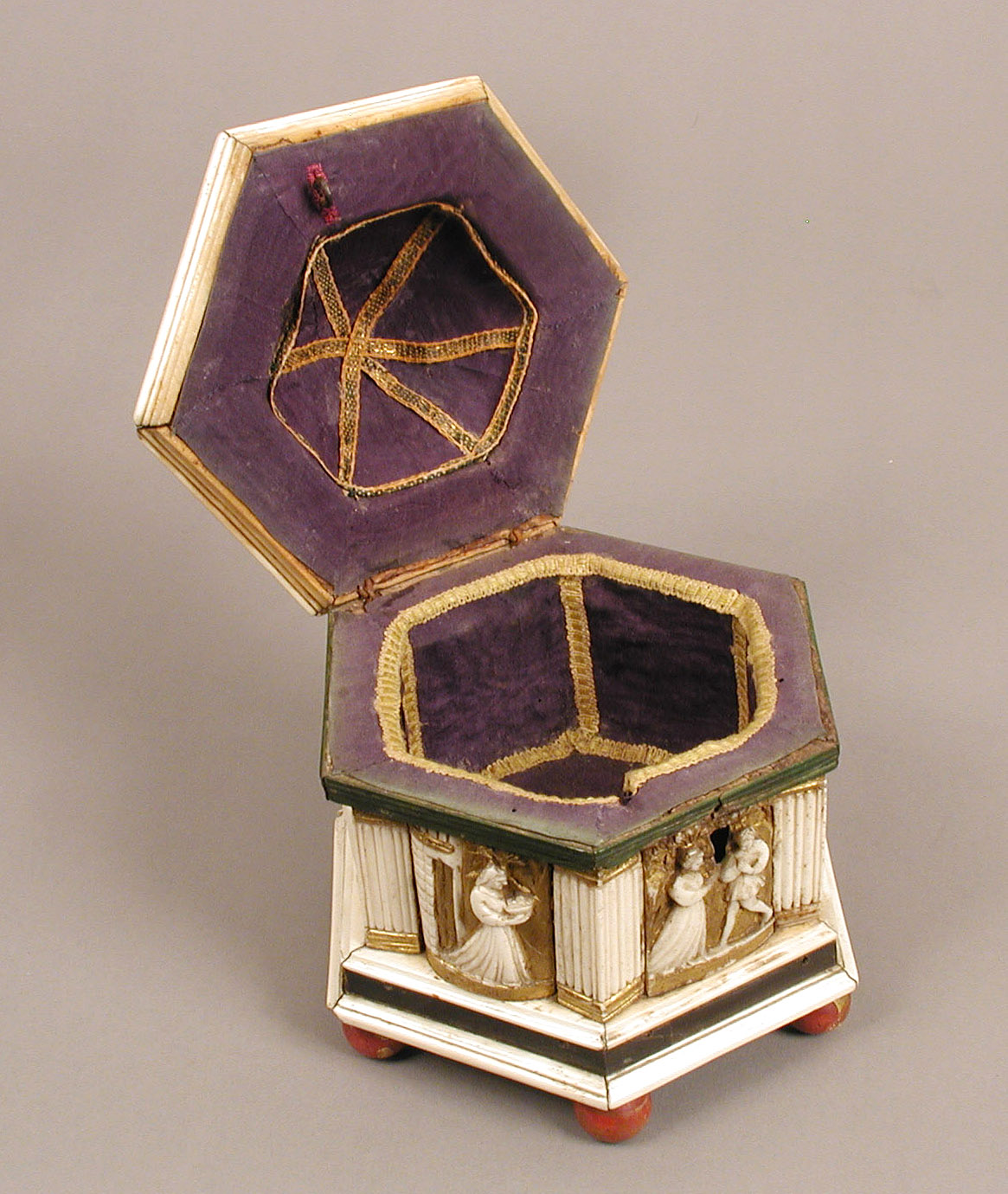
Open box showing hinges; late, with later elements and probably from another workshop.

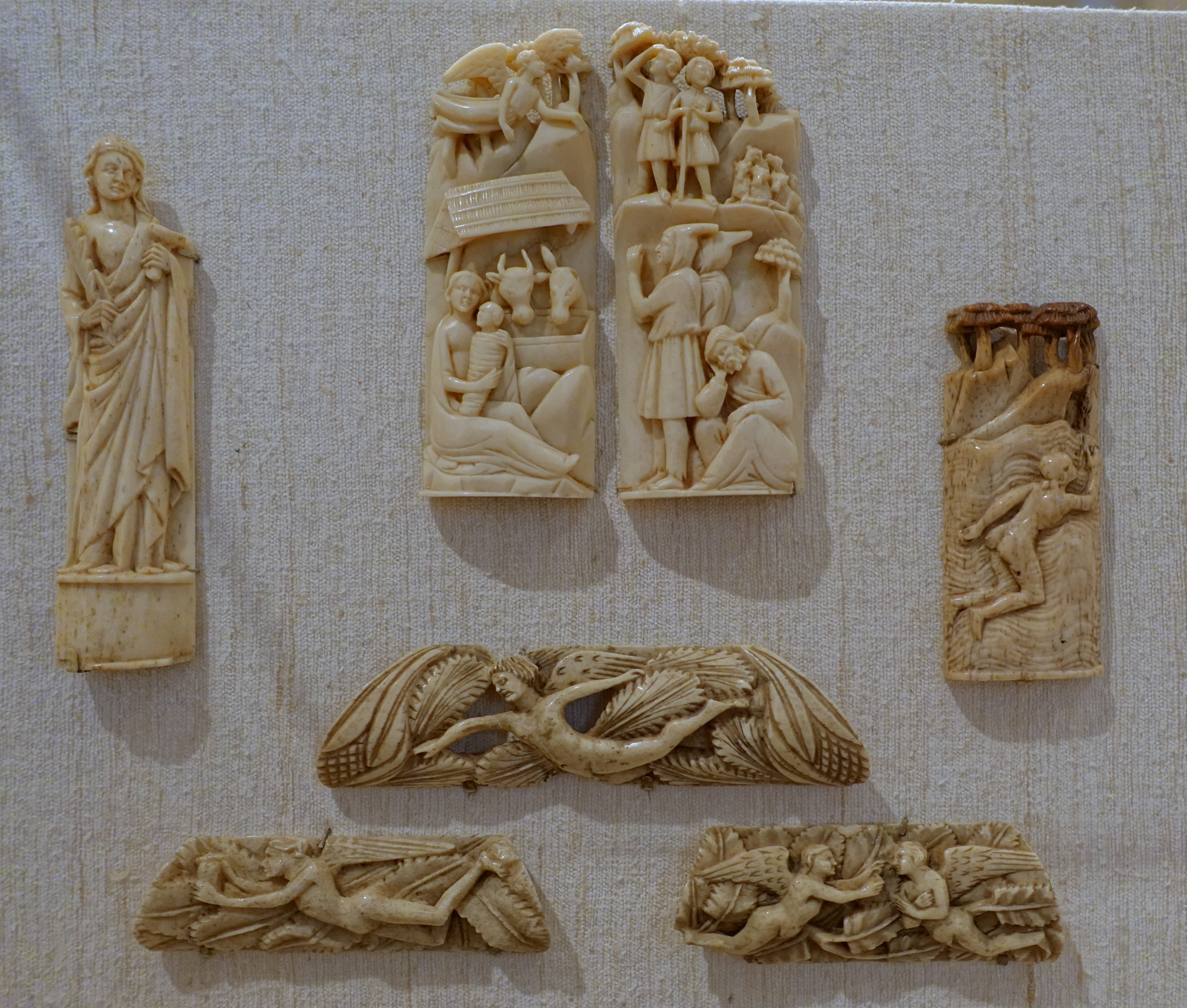
Loose panels, including a Nativity scene

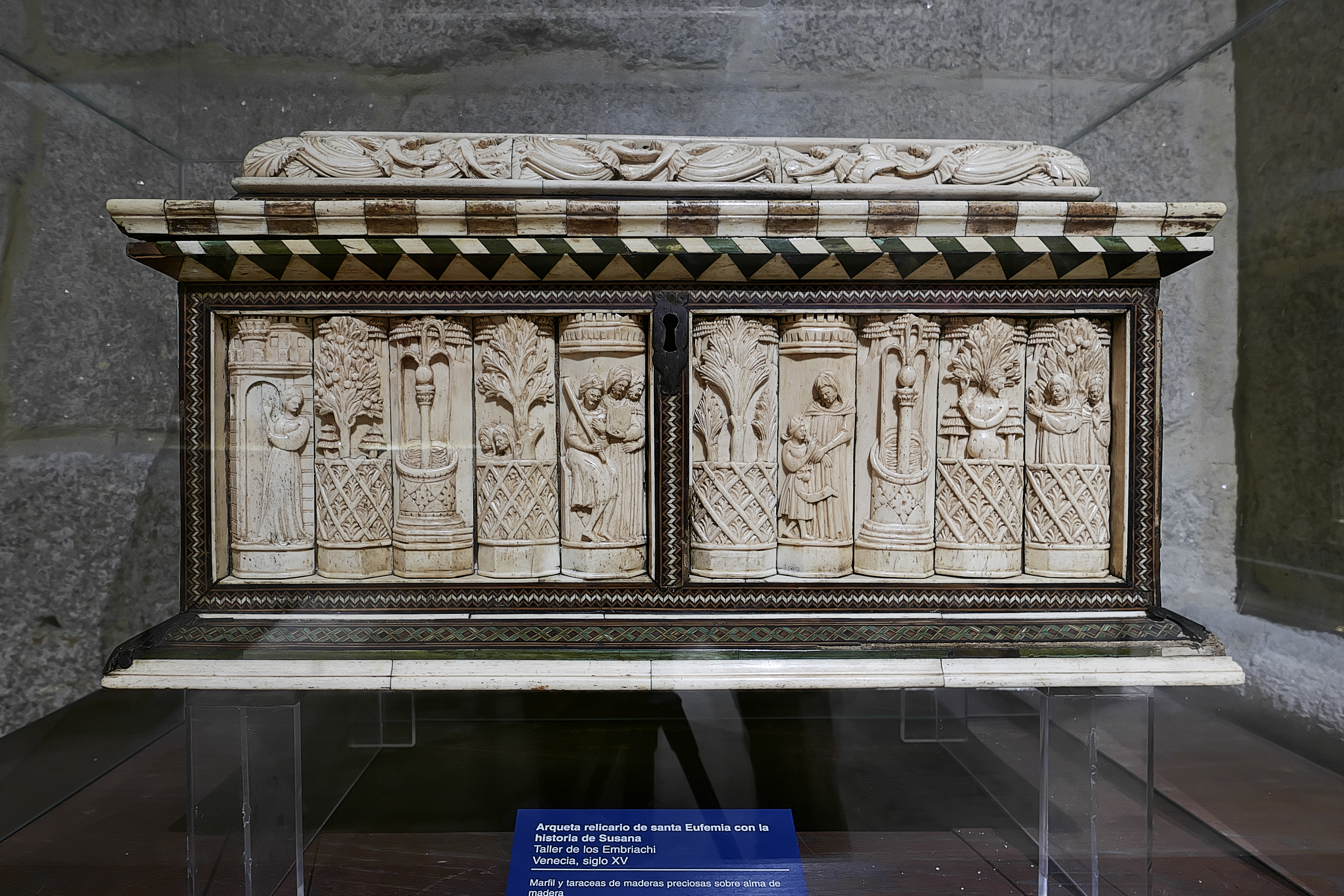
Cathedral of Orense, Spain
