= Bone carving =

Art, tools, and goods carved from bone

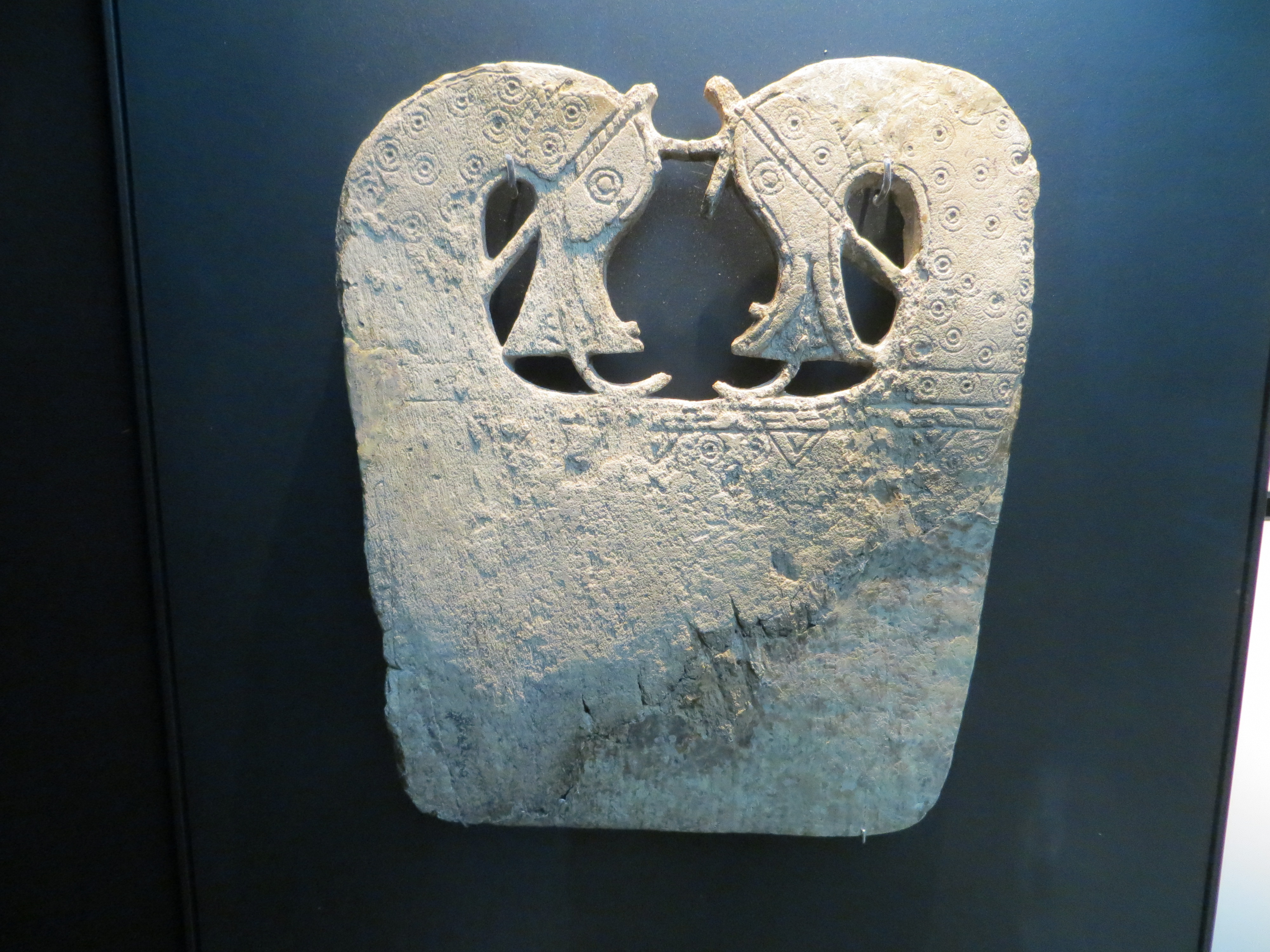
Viking whalebone plaque from Lilleberge, Norway, 9th-century.

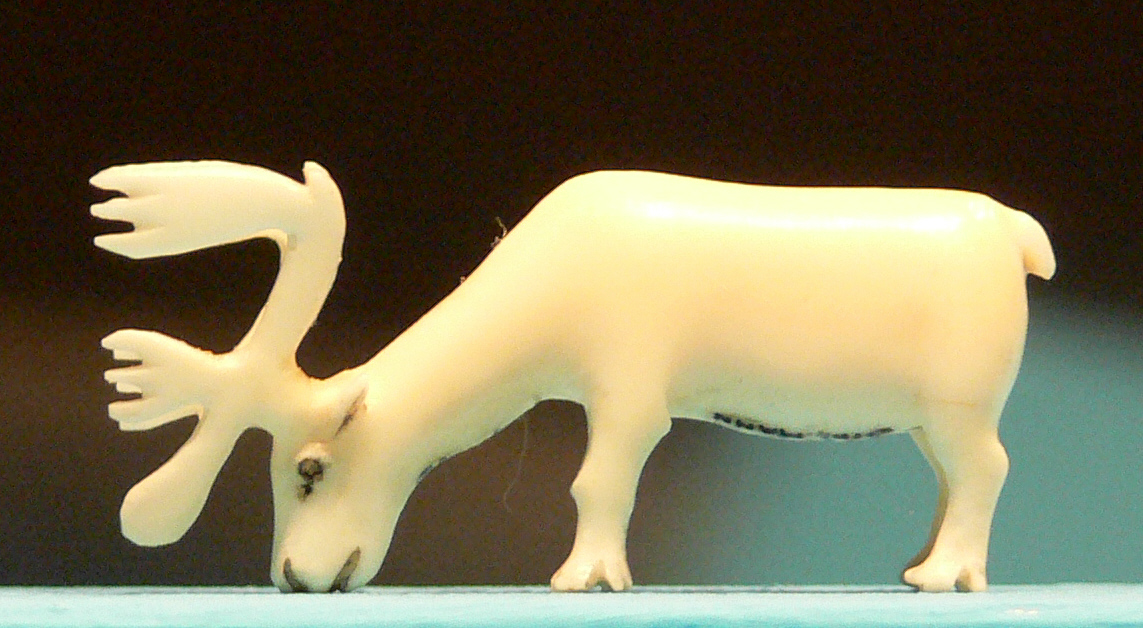
Grazing caribou made in Alaska c. 1910 - Linden Museum

Bone carving is creating art, tools, and other goods by carving animal bones, antlers, and horns. It can result in the ornamentation of a bone by engraving, painting or another technique, or the creation of a distinct formed object. Bone carving has been practiced by a variety of world cultures, sometimes as a cheaper, and recently a legal, substitute for ivory carving. As a material it is inferior to ivory in terms of hardness, and so the fine detail that is possible, and lacks the "lustrous" surface of ivory. The interior of bones are softer and even less capable of a fine finish, so most uses are as thin plaques, rather than sculpture in the round. But it must always have been much easier to obtain in regions without populations of elephants, walrus or other sources of ivory.

It was important in prehistoric art, with notable figures like the Swimming Reindeer, made of antler, and many of the Venus figurines. The Anglo-Saxon Franks Casket is a whale bone casket imitating earlier ivory ones. Medieval bone caskets were made by the Embriachi workshop of north Italy (c. 1375–1425) and others, mostly using rows of thin plaques carved in relief.

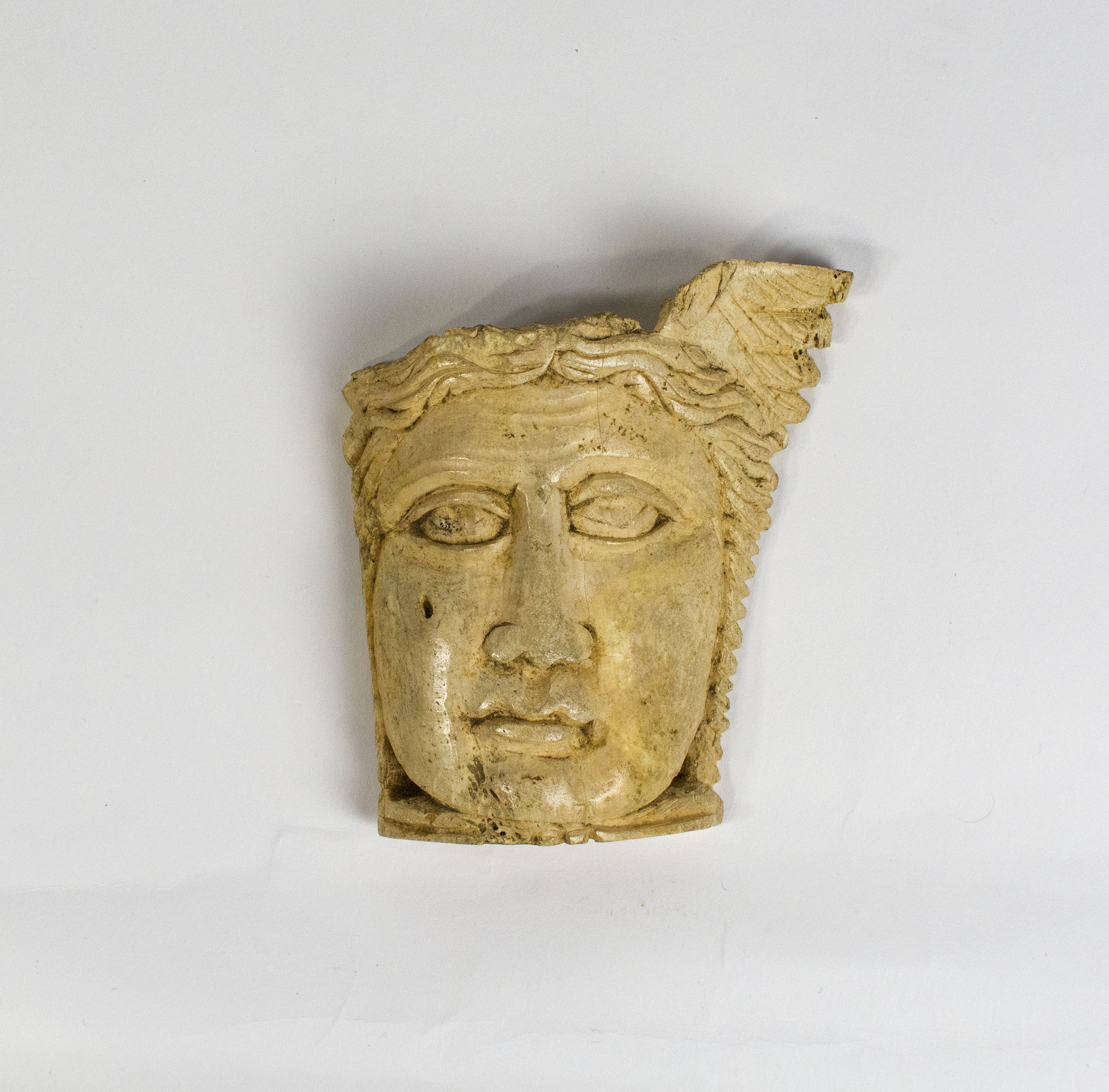
A face carved on a piece of curved bone. The face is framed by hair and part of a winged head-dress remains. Coptic

Flat bones were also used by artists and craftsmen to try out their designs, especially by metalworkers. Such pieces are known as "trial-pieces".

In July 2021, scientists reported the discovery of a bone carving, one of the world's oldest works of art, made by Neanderthals about 51,000 years ago.

Both whalebone (baleen) and the normal skeletal whale bones were often carved, especially for scrimshaw and in the Middle Ages.
