= Wooden Toys of Varanasi =

Wooden toy-making is a traditional craft in the Varanasi district of Uttar Pradesh, India. Bright and colourful lacquered toys are made by clusters of skilled craftsmen. These toys were given the Geographical Indication tag in 2014, along with other lacquer ware produced in this region.

== History ==
According to the craftsmen, their ancestors specialised in ivory carving that enjoyed good patronage during the reign of the Mughal emperors and the British. After ivory was banned by the Government of India, they shifted to woodcarving.

== Process of manufacture ==
Wooden logs are sourced from nearby areas such as the jungles of Chitrakoot and Sonbhadra. Keria (Coraiya) wood from Bihar was used earlier and it is still the preferred type of wood for toy-making. But after the government banned the cutting of Keria trees in the 1980s, the craftsmen switched to using the wood from eucalyptus, which is now used predominantly. Stacks of wooden logs can be seen stored outside the houses of the wood-carvers.

Pieces of wood are cut out from the logs according to the size of the toy that is to be made. Each piece is heated slowly to remove all the moisture from the wood. This process is time-consuming. The piece is sanded in order to smoothen its surface.

The wood is either hand-carved or shaped using lathe. Lathe is preferred for toys that are axially symmetric. In hand-carving, first the design of the toy is drawn on the wood. Then, the wood is sculpted with chisel and hammer according to the design. Once shaped, the surface of the toy is smoothened using a file and the toy is sent for painting.

Toys are given several coats of paint, and finished with a clear or coloured lacquer. Paint brushes made out of the hair from squirrel’s tail are used for painting fine lines.

Lacquering may also be done on a lathe. For slender and delicate items, hand-lathe is preferred. A lac stick is pressed against the toy which is fixed to the lathe. While the toy keeps revolving, the heat generated by friction softens the lac, making it stick to the toy.

== Geographical Indication Tag ==
Artisan groups from the region applied for the GI tag in September 2013 and their request was granted in November 2014.
