= Ivories =

Ivories may refer to:

- Ivory carvings, objects made from ivory
- Piano keys, slang as keys were made from ivory until the 1950s
- Dice, slang as dice were made from ivory from ancient times into the 20th century
- Teeth, slang as teeth are composed of much of the same material as ivory
