= Sri Lankan ivories =

Ivory artifacts from Sri Lanka

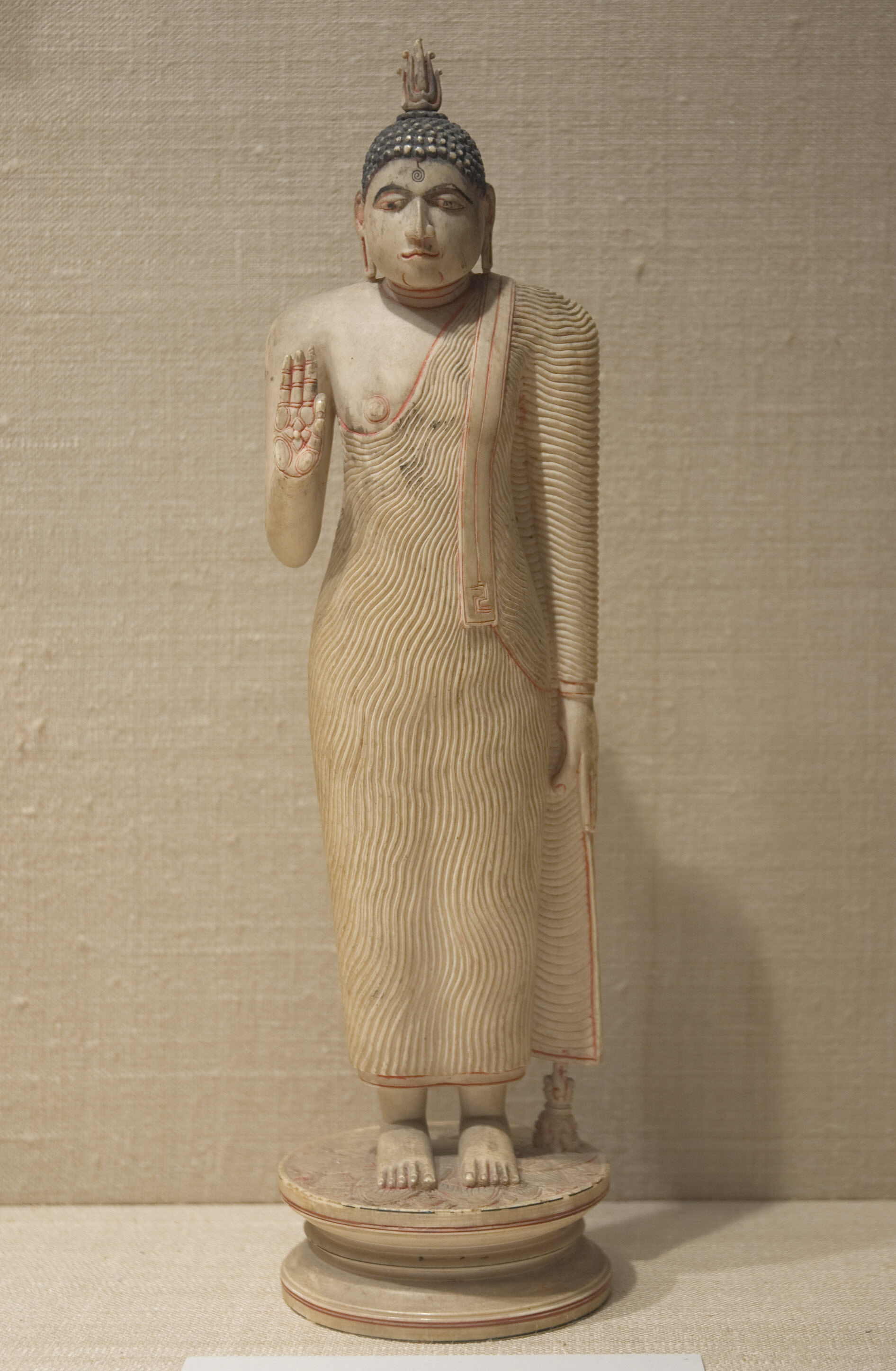
An ivory Buddha statue, 18th century; Metropolitan Museum of Art.

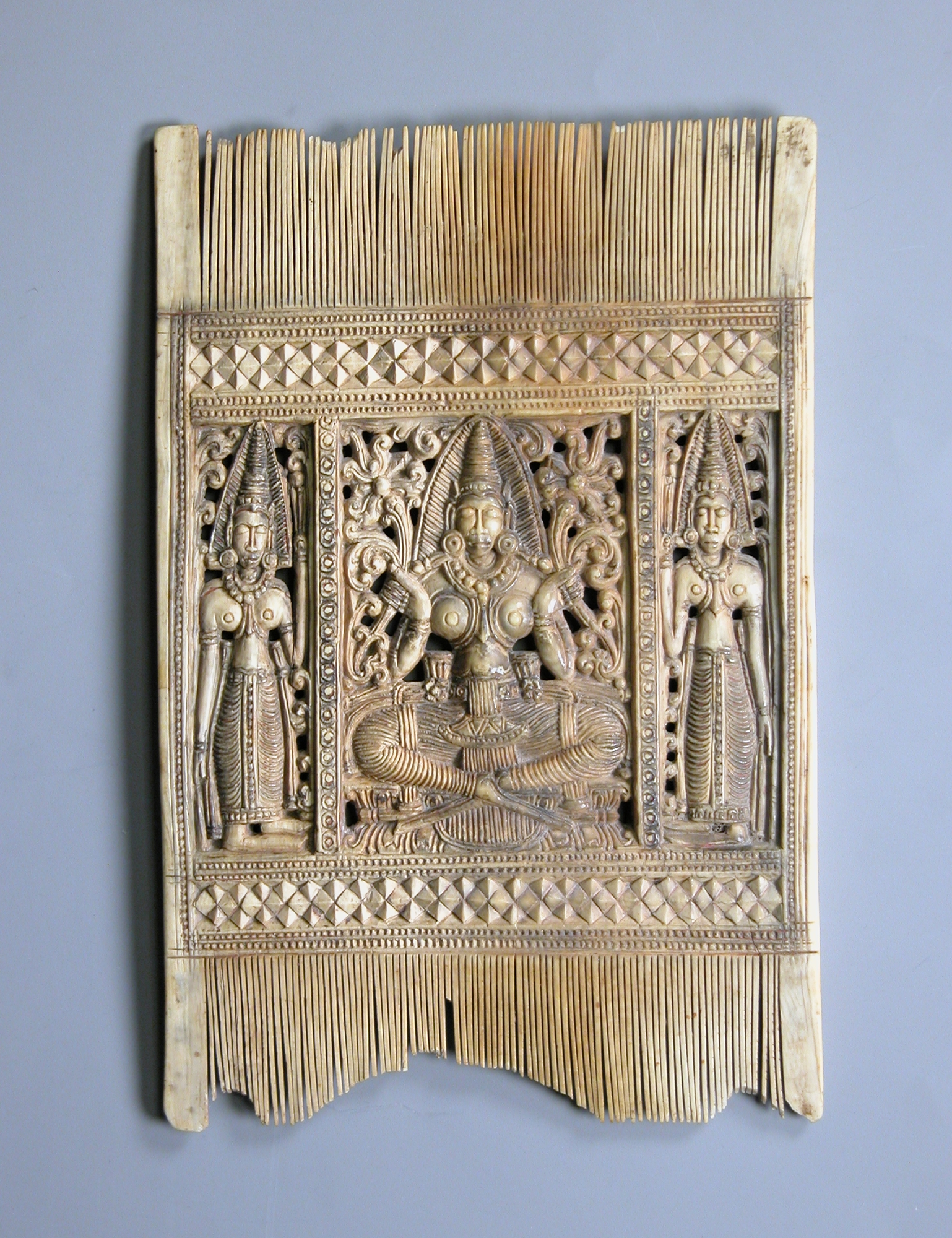
Ivory comb, 18th century; Metropolitan Museum of Art.

Ivory carving is one of the traditional industries of Sri Lanka. The country's ivory carving industry has a very long history, but its origin is not yet fully understood. During the Kingdom of Kandy, ivory art became very popular and reached at its zenith. These delicate ivory works represent how Sri Lankan craftsmen mastered in this technique.

== History ==
Sri Lankan ivory carving industry began in the 1st century BC. King Jetthatissa of the Anuradhapura Kingdom has patronised the ivory industry. Most of the surviving ivory works are attributed to Kandyan Kingdom. Sri Lankan ivory industry began during the Anuradhapura period. The oldest surviving ivory piece ever found in Sri Lanka is the image of a woman wearing a pearl girdle found from the southern vāhalkada of Ruwanweli stupa. Ancient chronicle Mahavamsa mentions that King Parakramabahu the Great of Polonnaruwa had built a garden with decorative ivory railings.

Due to the rarity of ivory, possessing ivory items were considered as a symbol of dignity in the past. These ivory works may have presented to kings, foreign ambassadors, and other high officials.

During the period of Portuguese Ceylon, works made for export bore similarities with the Afro-Portuguese ivories.

== Creation ==
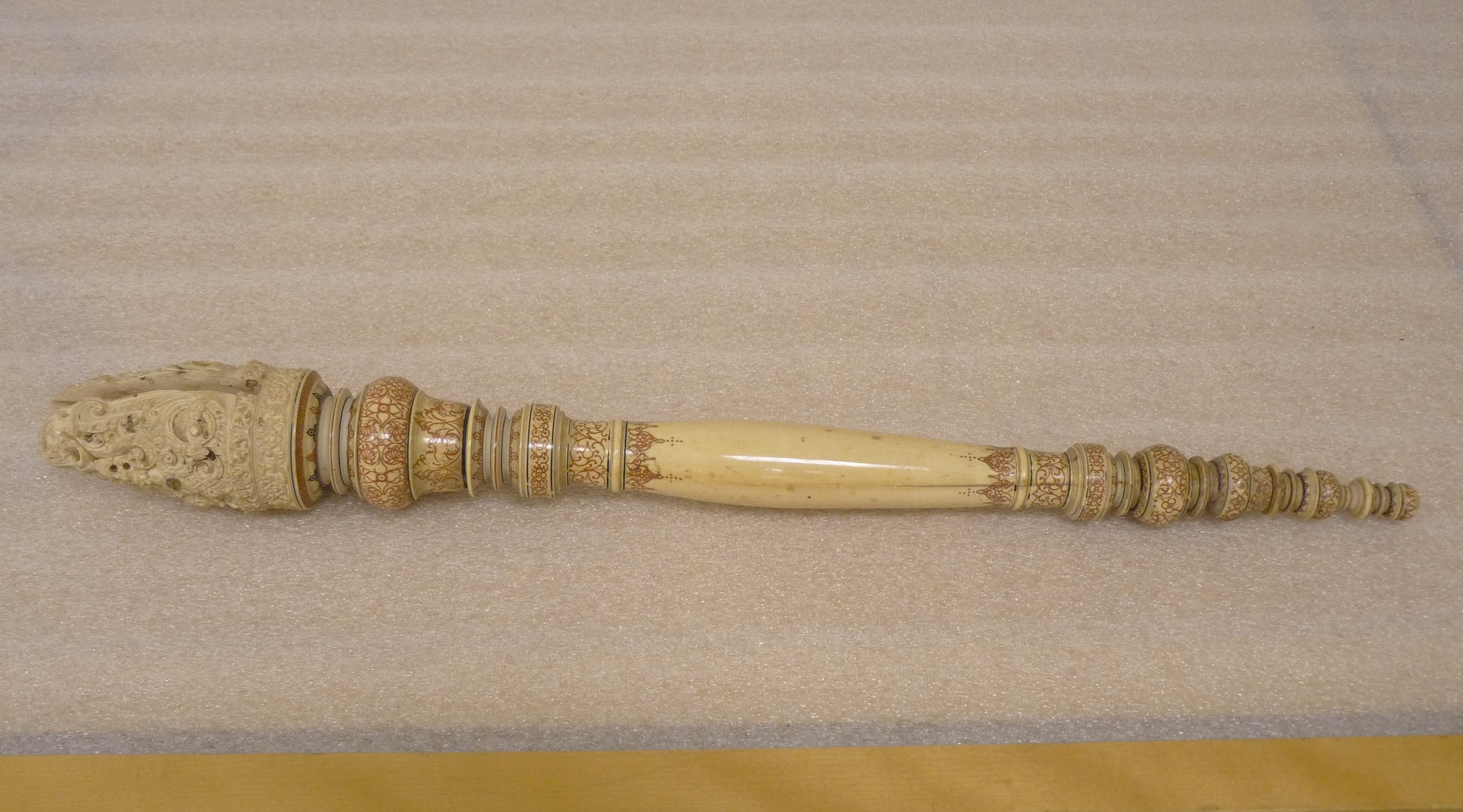
Ivory fan handle, 18th century AD. Metropolitan Museum of Art.

Ivory carving technique consists of two main steps: the turning and carving.

During the turning, ivory is cut using a saw and shaped using a turning lathe (pattalaya). A simple wood lathe is used. Then it is softened by using various plant saps. Then carving is done. Tools like saw, drill, rasp, vice, and chisel are used in this step. Later the object is polished using alum. If there are any holes in the object, they are filled up with lac and decorated. Ultimately natural pigments like red, yellow, and black together with minerals and adhesive compounds are used to get the end quality of the item.

Bangles, fan handles, caskets, knife hilts, combs, boxes, trumpets, earrings, door frames, decorative plates, and sports equipment were produced using ivory. Buddha statues and human figures were also produced.

== Decorative elements ==
There are three kinds of motifs used in Sri Lankan ivory art: animal figures, anthropomorphic figures and floral decorations. Decorations like petal designs, kudirakkan, nārilatā, bhērunda pakshiyā, makarā, kimbisi muhuna, panā decorations and dancing figures were commonly used in the Kandyan Period.

== Examples ==
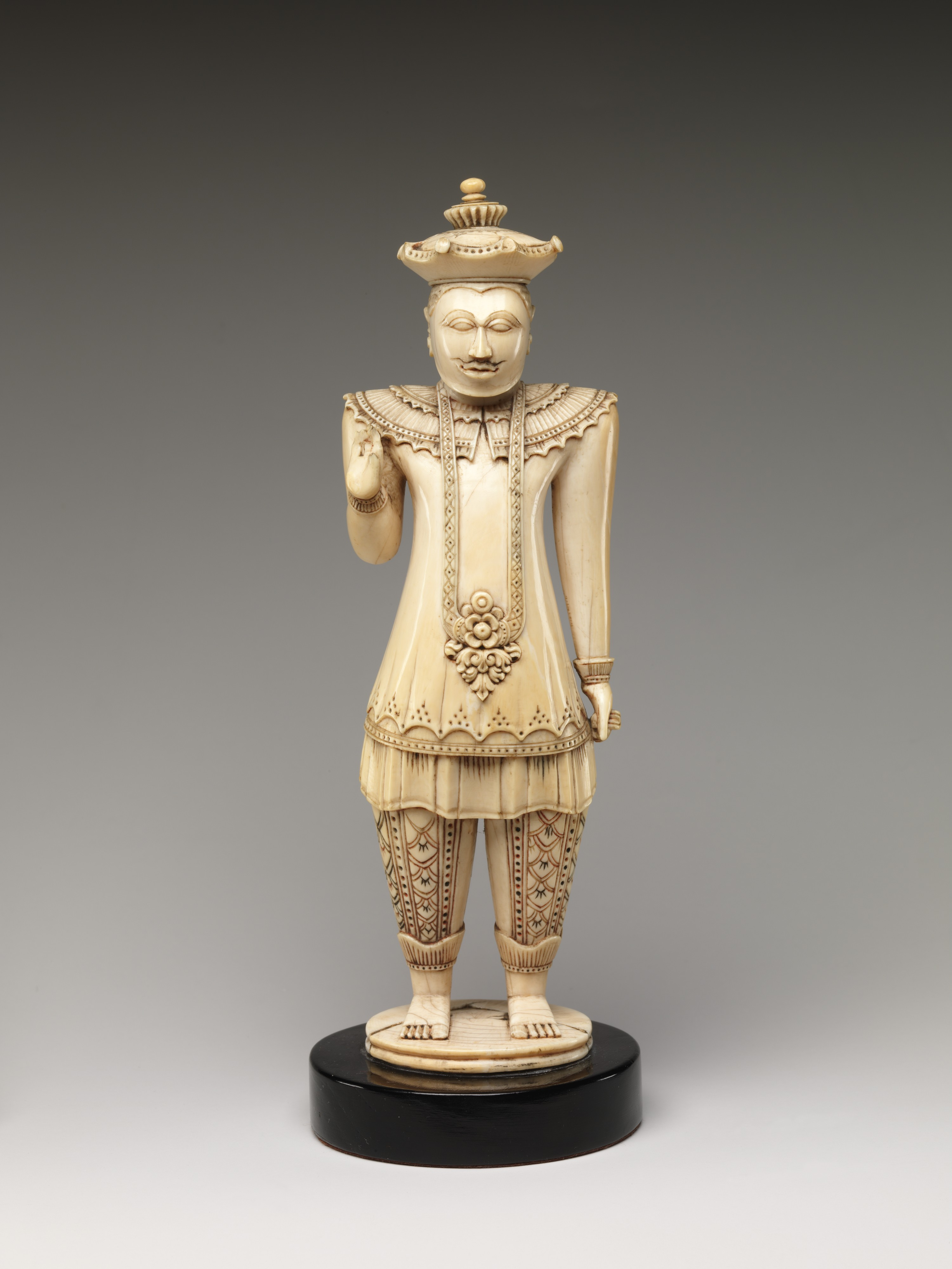
An image depicting a royalty, early 19th century; Metropolitan Museum of Art.

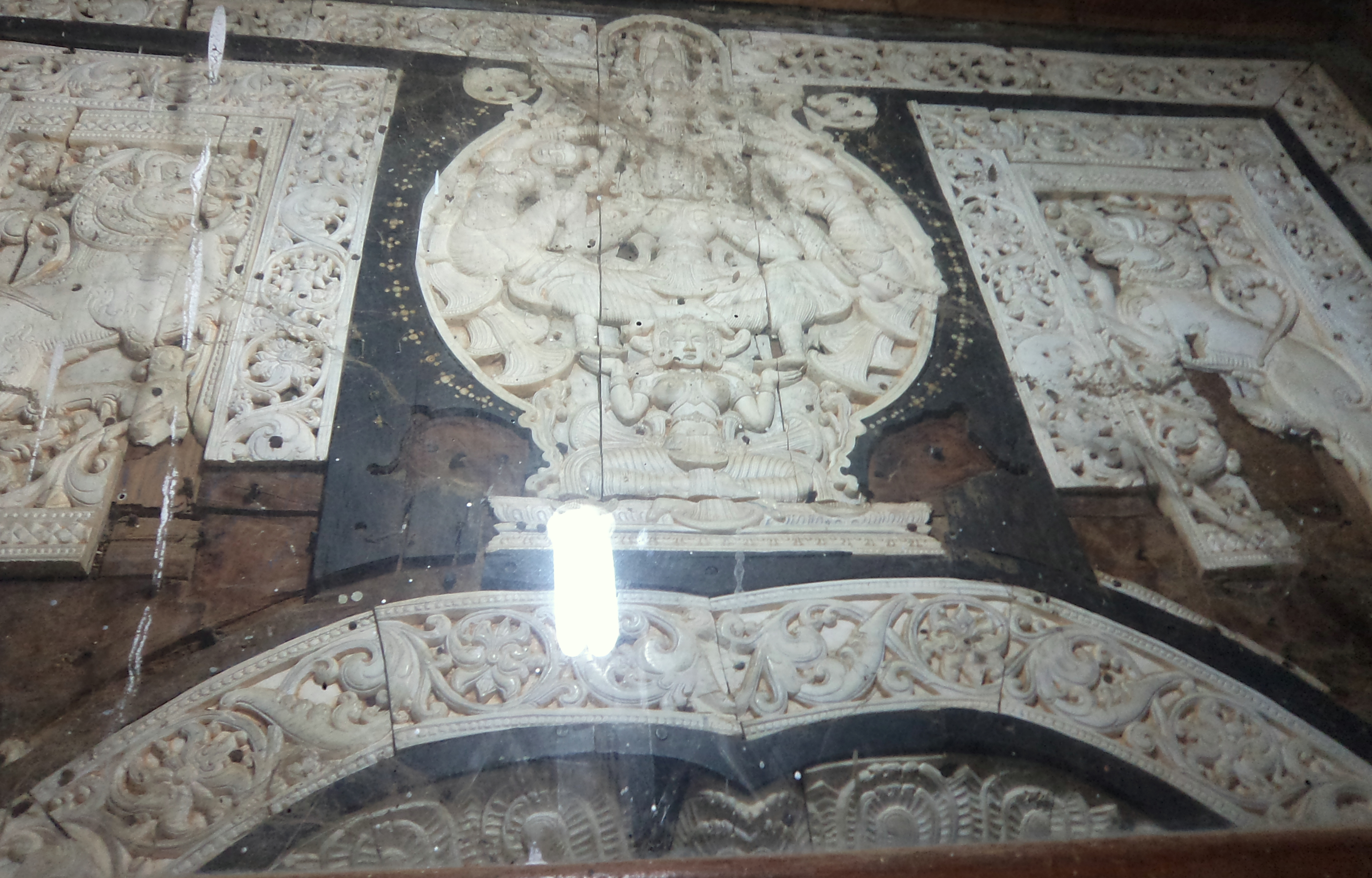
The panchanāri ghataya of Ridi Viharaya, Kurunegala.

The finest example for Sri Lankan ivory carving are the ivory carvings at the door-frame of Ridi Viharaya, Kurunegala. Delicately carved panchnāri ghataya motif and two dancer images can be seen here. There is a gajasinha carving at the corridor of the temple. Temple of the Tooth also houses fine ivory decorations.

Many examples for ivory works from the Kandyan kingdom can be observed at Colombo National Museum and National Museum of Kandy. The standing ivory Buddha in vitarka mudra displayed in the Colombo National Museum is considered a masterpiece of Sri Lankan ivory art. Another ivory work, a chest belonging to the Kingdom of Kotte is housed in Munich Residenz, Germany. This chest is decorated with carvings depicting the coronation of King Dharmapala.
