= African ivories =

African ivories are objects and materials that are created from ivory or include ivory material that comes from the continent of Africa. The ivory from Africa would become widely sought after by the 14th century due in part to the poorer quality of Asian ivory. While Asian ivory is brittle, more difficult to polish, and tends to yellow with exposure to air, African ivory often comes in larger pieces, a more sought after cream color, and is easier to carve. Ivory from Africa came from one of two types of elephant in Africa; the more desirable bush elephant with larger and heavier tusks or the forest elephant with smaller and straighter tusks.

Ivory tusks as well as ivory objects such as carved masks, salt cellars, oliphants and other emblems of importance have been traded and used as gifts and religious ceremonies for hundreds of years in Africa.

== History of Ivory in Africa ==
African ivory has been treasured since ancient times in part because of how it could be carved as well as how difficult it was to acquire. These qualities additionally mean that ivory has always been a symbol of wealth and luxury that can was used to decorate the ivory coffers of Tutankhamen's Egypt, as well as the ivory throne made by King Solomon. While it is known that the indigenous people of Africa did hunt elephants, it is unknown if they were killed specifically for their tusks. However, by the fourteenth century BCE, elephants were hunted in Egypt for their ivory tusks. During this period the three primary sources of ivory were India, Syria, and North Africa including Egypt. The ivory from North Africa was highly desired by Egypt due to the presence of ivory along the commercial routes of the Nile as well as foreign entities such as the Carthaginian and Roman empires. However, due to changing climates and the ruthless exploitation and over hunting of elephants for their ivory in this region, the elephant populations began to disappear and by the fourth century CE no living elephants existed north of the Sahara desert.

In other regions of Africa, ivory was decorated and carved though there was little to no hunting with the purpose of acquiring ivory until around 1000 CE. There are however several existing examples of carved ivory masks, statuettes, caskets, jewelry, bells, rattles, and other emblems of importance created during this period in Benin and Niger. The Muslim Arab invasion of North Africa in the seventh and eighth centuries brought about trade with Africans south of the Sahara. This newly established trade network allowed African towns such as Koumbi Saleh, Gao, and Timbuktu to become important trade centers. In these areas, elephant tusks and other forms of ivory were traded for exotic novelties such as silk, copper ornaments, damascened swords, pots, and pans. Additionally, during this period, overseas contracts were established in eastern Africa to furthering the trade of African ivory.

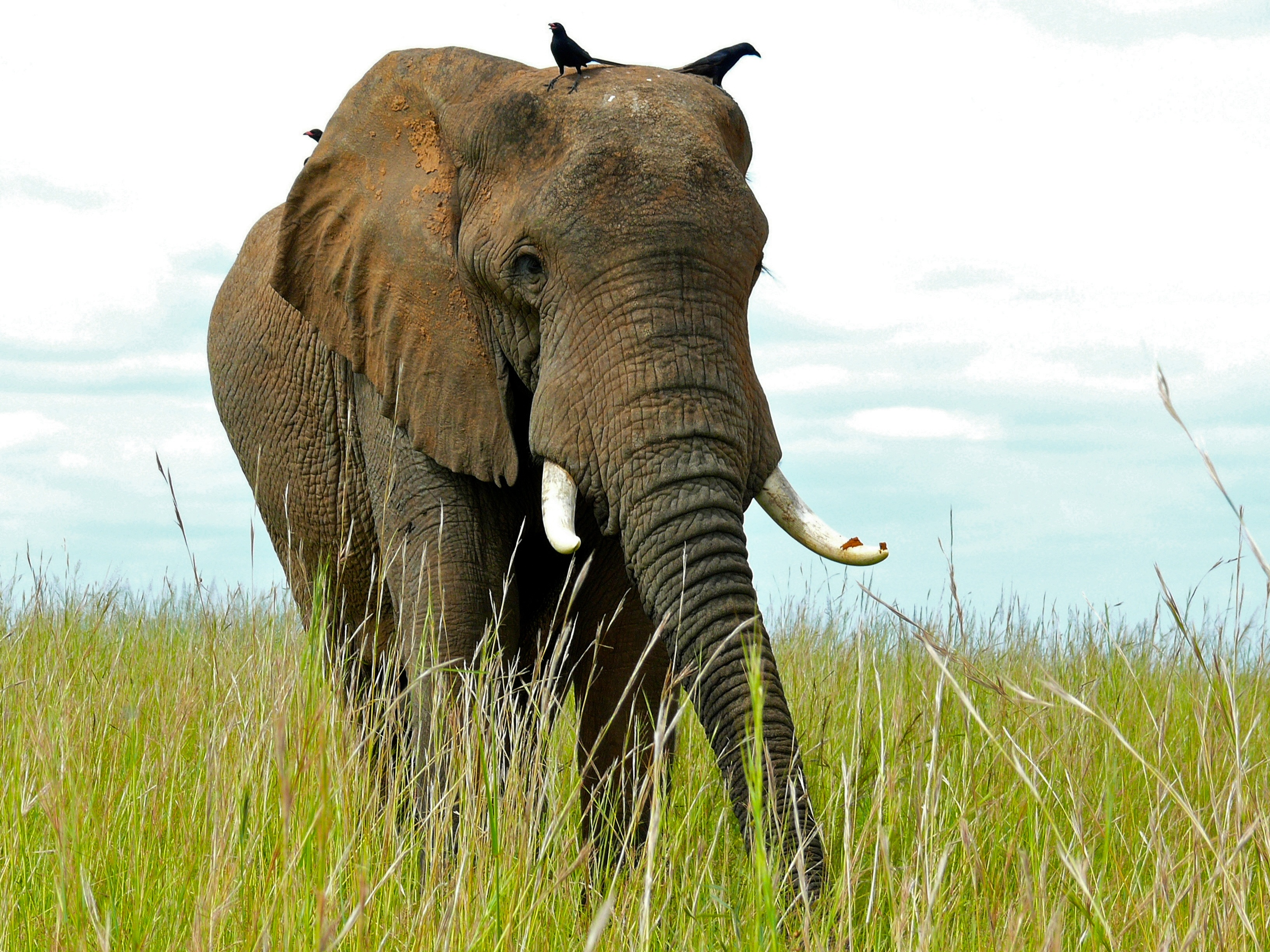
African Savannah Elephant (Loxodonta africana)

With the newly established ivory trade in sub-Saharan Africa, African ivory began appearing in medieval Europe. This is in larger part to the Muslim presence and trade in central Africa. Portugal, enamored by the prospect of African ivory began searching for alternate sources that did not involve trading with the Muslims. As a result, Portuguese expeditions began exploring the Atlantic seaboard of Africa. Henry the Navigator, a prince of Portugal, funded and even joined many of these maritime explorations. By 1460, after Henry's death, the Portuguese reached the area that would be labeled as the Ivory Coast due to the abundance of the material. Where African elephants no longer existed north of the Sahara, they were still numerous in other regions of Africa. During their expeditions, the Portuguese also marked locations across the African coast where they would be able to easily establish bases and forts as well as take advantage of the indigenous people and resources. Some of the African rulers in those areas became clients and eventually vassals, meanwhile, the Muslim rulers of East Africa were mostly pushed out by the Europeans. The new presence of the Portuguese and growing demand in Europe for ivory stimulated life in old trade routes into central Africa. Areas such as Luanda, Benguela, Mozambique, and Mombasa became hosts to the trade of unprecedented amounts of African ivory. This trade expanded so quickly that by the sixteenth century approximately 30,000 pounds of African ivory passed through the port of Sofala. African port cities were equipped to handle the sudden increase of exports with existing trade networks and robust infrastructure. Portuguese sailors reportedly did not experience much culture shock when they arrived in western Africa; rather, some experienced awe as they thought the great urban centers of Africa comparable to Lisbon, saying that African cities offered superior organization and hygiene despite their larger populations.

== Afro-Portuguese Ivories ==
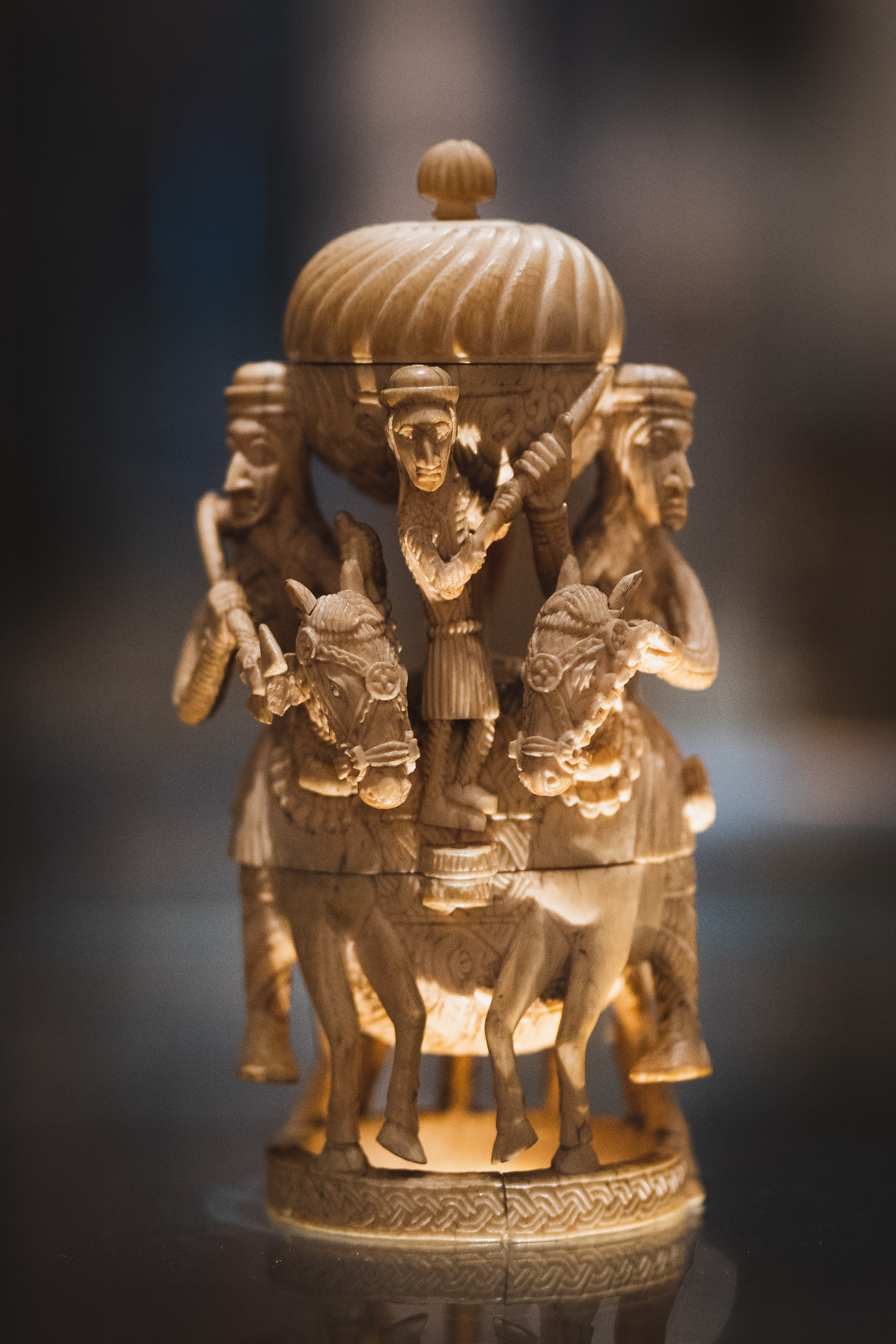
Afro-Portuguese ivory in the British Museum

Afro-Portuguese ivories are the sculptural works of ivory produced by the people of west-central Africa's Lower Kongo region. In the Kongo Kingdom, ivory was a precious commodity that was strictly controlled by chiefs and kings, who commissioned sculptors to produce fine ivory sculptures for their personal and courtly use. A significant number of these ivories are now in the British Museum, many of them made in Sierra Leone and Benin in the fifteenth and sixteenth centuries.

Most of the earliest extant ivory carvings from sub-Saharan Africa were not made for African consumers. Richly decorated oliphants, or side-blown horns, from the sixteenth century are among the earliest known of the Kongo Kingdom's royal commissions in ivory. Although made in the form of musical instruments to be used during court ceremonies, many such sculptures were likely given as gifts and made for sale to Portuguese elites, missionaries, and traders. In the 1950s, historian William Fagg coined the term “Afro-Portuguese ivories” to describe Kongo oliphants and other ivory sculptures from this period. A significant number of Afro-Portuguese ivories are in the British Museum, many of them made in Sierra Leone and Benin in the 15th and 16th centuries.

Although ivory is an easily worked material, the ability of determining which sections to carve and how deeply to carve is as technical as cutting diamonds. These objects would often be showcased in a cabinet of curiosities or a studiolo. Prominent motifs of African art are visible in the African ivories, including humans as the subject, and a skill for articulating complex geometries. Motifs in African ivory art of the period show a merging of themes from European patrons and African stylization, establishing a relationship not only as patron and artist but, also as equals through trade that is visualized through art and craft as truly hybrid objects. Uniquely, these African-made ivory objects show imagery that predates the later colonialist and racist iconography due to ensuing power-imbalance between Europe and Africa.

=== Sapi-Portuguese Ivories ===
Sapi-Portuguese Ivories are ivories that have been derived from animals and made by Sapi artists from modern-day Sierra Leone. The human figures that were used in Sapi-Portuguese ivories were typically static, with a majority of figures either standing or sitting while facing outward.

==== Sapi Oliphants ====
The term "oliphant" was derived from the name of the animal from which the ivories were sourced: the elephant. Oliphants were used as horns, and were often taken into battle or used during the hunt. These elaborately carved wind instruments carved from ivory were made for Europeans by African artists. Because the oliphants were used in battle and hunting, they were usually decorated accordingly, with scenes of hunting, combat, and a collection of animals and figures that correlated to the activities taking place. Moreover, oliphants were decorated with different motifs, mottos, inscriptions, and coats of arms of particular Kings of Europe. Oliphants were carved by African artists in various geographic regions as evidenced by the slight variations in motifs. Occasionally, oliphant artists designed the horns to make the mouthpiece look like an animal, especially animals that represented ferocity, such as dragons or wild dogs. Carved into the oliphants were other animal representations, wild, domesticated, and fantastical. The wild animals usually were elephants, rhinoceros, crowned lions/lionesses, and goats. There were also domesticated animals such as enchained elephants, and mythical creatures shown as unicorns, centaurs, and birds with unusual body parts.

=== Bini-Portuguese Ivories ===
Bini-Portuguese Ivories are ivories that were created in the Kingdom of Benin, now modern-day Nigeria. Very few ivories from this region of Africa have survived; furthermore, no forks, daggers, knife handles, or religious implements have been found. Uniquely to the Benin culture, most of the carvers had been commissioned by the oba (the ruler) of the Kingdom of Benin to work in a craft guild called the Igbesanmwan, and all lived on the same street in order to easily work together. It has been argued that because the oba commissioned these ivories, they were not made for export to Europe unless the oba allowed for export. Moreover, as a tribute, the oba required elephant hunters to give him one of the tusks from each of their elephants, and was always able to buy the second tusk as well. These tusks made up the supplies for the carvers. The figures that were carved into these pieces were typically carved in motion, in comparison to the figures in the Sapi-Portuguese ivories that were static.

==== Bini Oliphants ====
Only three examples of the Bini-Portuguese oliphants still exist today, with only two complete in their carving. The surfaces of the oliphants are totally covered with geometric patterns. The oliphants have both Bini and Portuguese motifs: from Benin we see the use of the basket weave, lozenge, guilloche, and step patterns, whereas coats of arms, hunting scenes, and the armillary sphere are drawn from Portuguese imagery. The mouthpiece on these oliphants is always rectangular and located on the convex side of the oliphant itself. Because all of the known Bini-Portuguese oliphants share these features, it is recognized that they were all created by royal carvers that were a part of the oba’s igbesamwan guild.

==== Bini Saltcellars ====
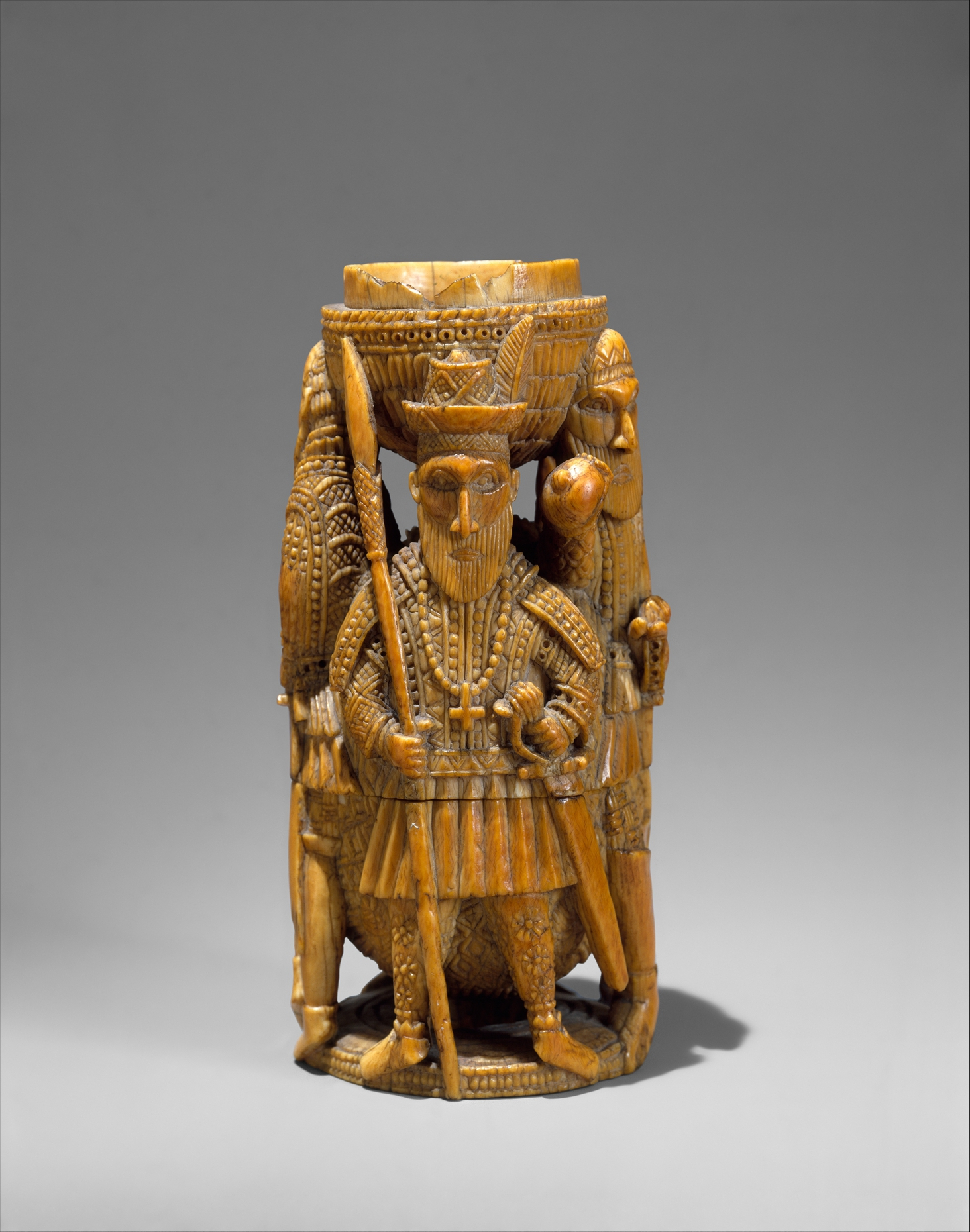
Bini-Portuguese Artist ("Master of the Heraldic Ship"), Saltcellar with Portuguese Figures, ca. 1525–1600, Nigeria, ivory, accession no. 1972.63a, b. Metropolitan Museum of Art.

All examples of Bini-Portuguese salt cellars are double-chambered, with two separate chambers that are connected vertically with a central tube. Artistically, the imagery on them is divided into two distinct themes: an upper theme and a lower theme. These two themes tend to be designed with differing figures and scenes that are in turn separated by a band/register on the center of the upper chamber. The salt cellars are designed with European imagery, with every human figure dressed in European costumes and clothing, and equestrian figures are often included as well. There is also weaponry included that was mainly used in Europe, such as the matchlock gun and swords.

=== Kongo Ivories ===
The Kongo ivories were made in the Kongo region of Africa. There are seven surviving oliphants, all of which are assumed to have been made by the same Kongo artist due to their uncanny similarities in their designs. The entire oliphant is intricately carved throughout, with plaited and interlaced patterns, designed in a spiral along the oliphant, which is a typical African design.The standout feature of these oliphants is the addition of geometric motifs: this is what places the oliphants in Kongo, as these designs are traditional amongst the people of the Kongo, and are represented in many forms of art in the community, such as carvings in wood and ivory, in select textiles, and even in body decoration. These geometric motifs were found in the Kongo far before the Portuguese had arrived. These oliphants were used during special occasions, such as investitures and funerals, and were also given as gifts to Portugal from the King of the Kongo.

== Carved ivories for export ==
Around the middle of the nineteenth century, a new style of ivory carving developed in the area to meet the demand of the export trade along the Loango Coast of west-central Africa. This style consisted of fine, detailed relief carving that depicts scenes of Kongo life. Scenes commonly portrayed in relief on the ivories capture the dynamic and cosmopolitan coastal activity related to the transatlantic trade.

Most carved Loango tusks are not longer than two to three feet because they were sourced from forest elephants, which are much smaller than the African savannah elephant. Full Loango tusk sculptures that were sculpted from the enormous tusks of savannah elephants are extremely rare; one notable example is now part of the Tropenmuseum in Amsterdam.

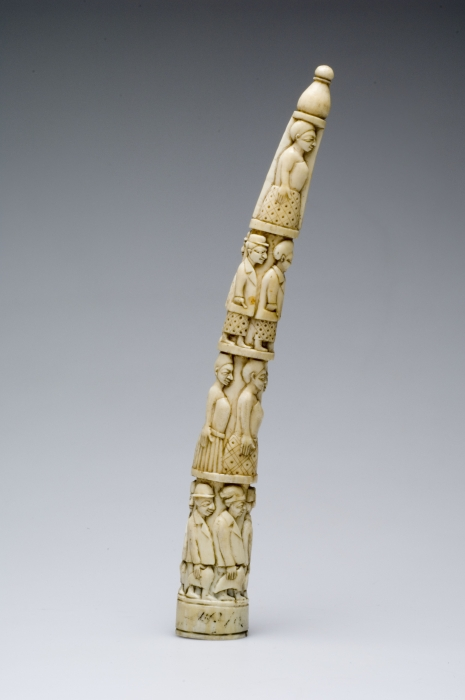
Elephant Tusk Carved with Figures in Relief, possibly from Longo Coast, late 19th century, accession no. 35.679, Brooklyn Museum

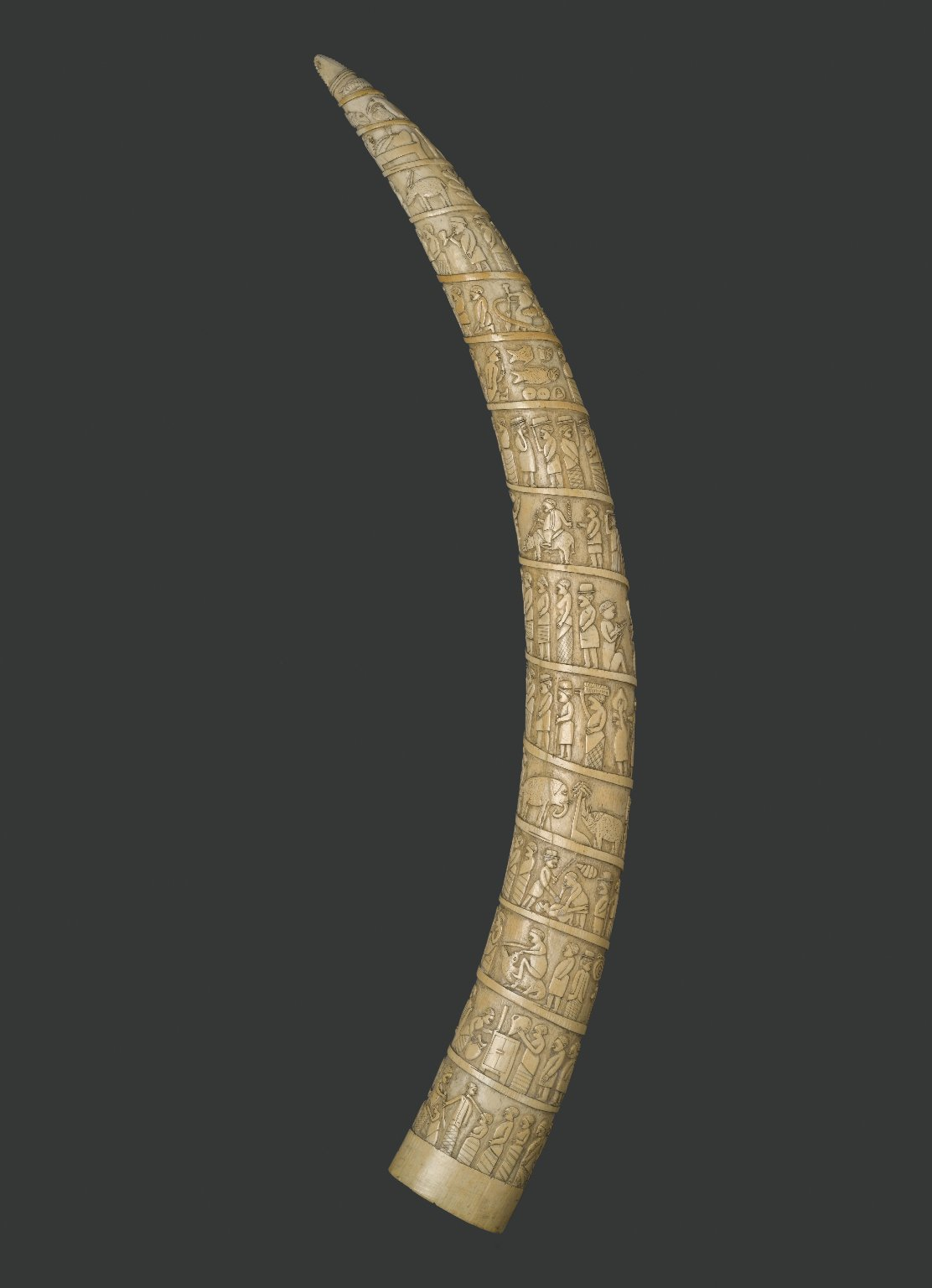
Intricately carved Loango coast ivory oliphant, 19th century, accession no. TM-A-11083, Tropenmuseum, Amsterdam (NMVW Collectie)
