= Pyxis (vessel) =

Cylindrical box from the classical world

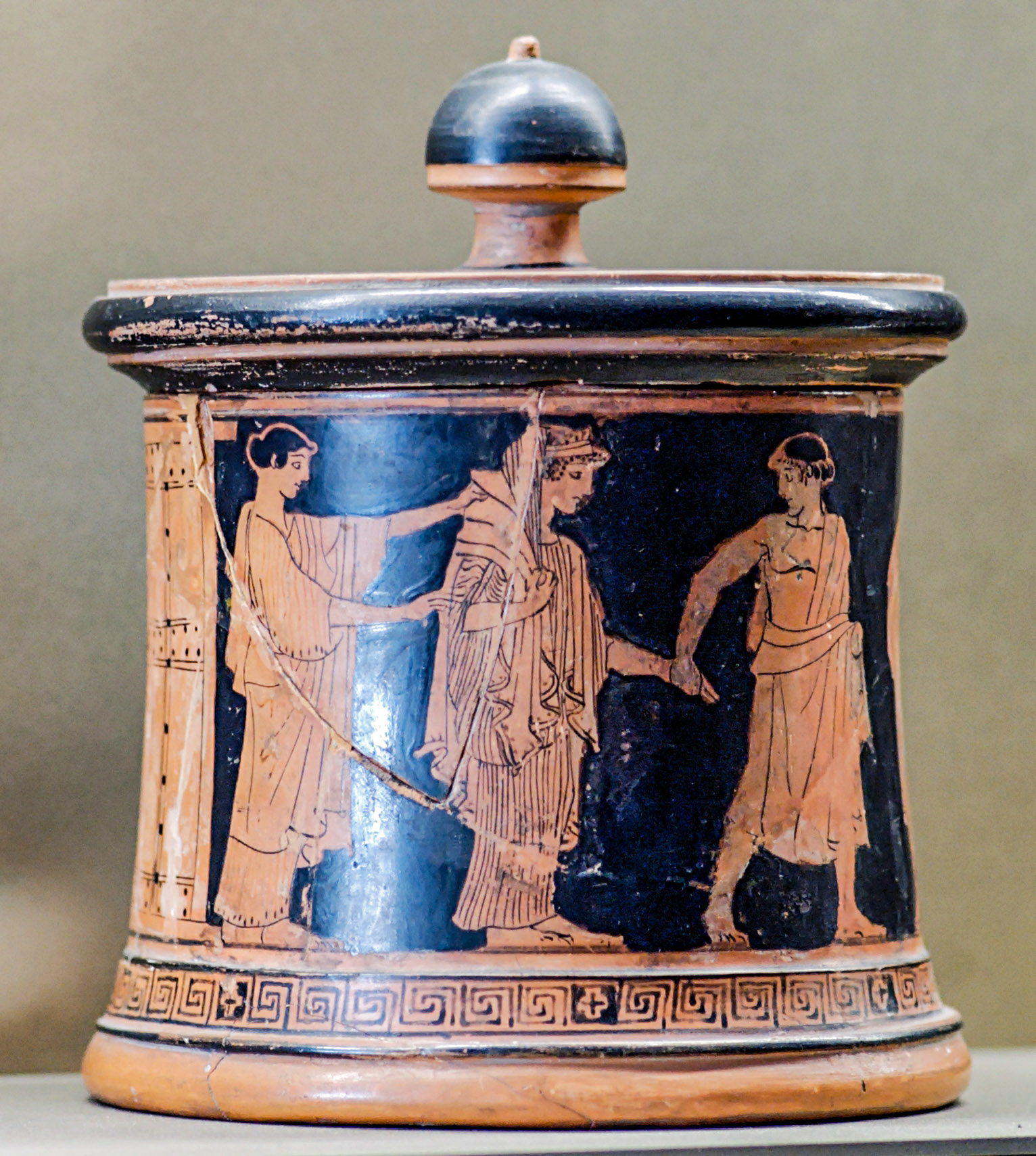
The wedding of Thetis and Peleus. Attic red-figure pyxis, c. 470–460 BC.

A pyxis (Greek: πυξίς; pl.: pyxides) is a shape of vessel from the classical world, usually a cylindrical box with a separate lid and no handles. They were used to hold cosmetics, trinkets or jewellery, but were also used for dispensing incense and by physicians to contain medicine. Surviving pyxides are mostly Greek pottery, but could also be made from a range of other materials: wood, bronze, ivory, marble, terracotta, silver, or stone. The name derived from Corinthian boxes made of wood from the tree puksos ("boxwood"). During the Classical period, the Attic word "kylichnis" was also used to refer to the same shape. The shape of the vessel can be traced in pottery back to the Protogeometric period in Athens, however the Athenian pyxis has various shapes itself.

== Types ==
There were many different varieties of pyxis, popular in different times and places. The earliest were the Protogeometric type of vessel which had a globular body, and the pointed-bottom pyxis from the early Geometric period. The pointed pyxis did not last much longer than the ninth century BCE. During the later Geometric period another style emerged with a flat, very broad base. Contemporary scholarship classifies pyxides as either: type A, type B, type C, type D, lekanis, Nikosthenic, or tripod.

=== Nikosthenic type ===
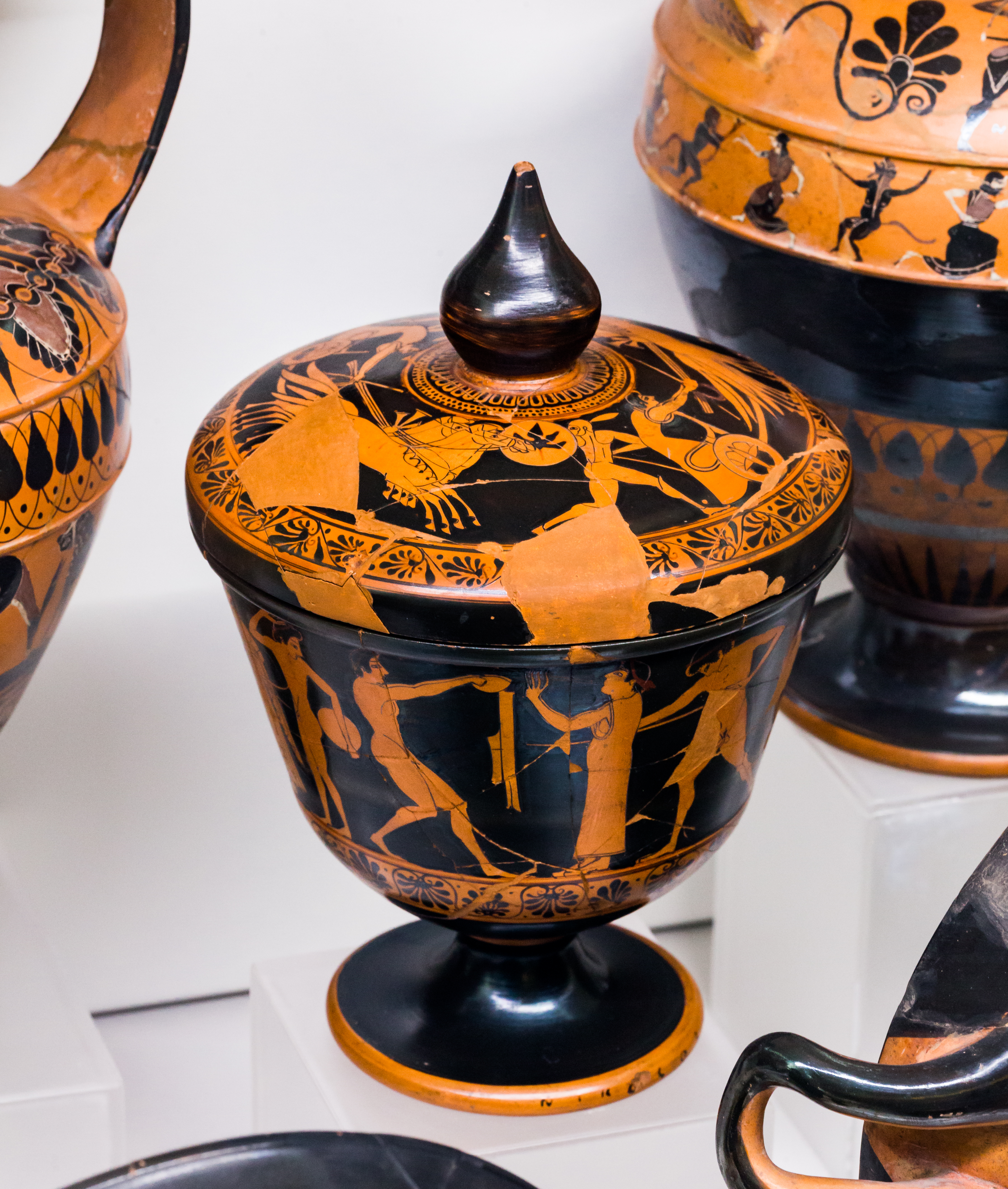
Nikosthenic Pyxis showcasing two charioteers and two Hoplites running - c. 520–500 BCE

This type was introduced by Nikosthenes during the late sixth century BCE. It is characterised by a deep, calyx-shaped bowl with a flanged rim and a stemmed foot, and a domed lid. The decorations on pyxides found in an Etruscan context tend towards depictions of battles and athletic contests; for pyxides found in Greek and near eastern Mediterranean settings the depictions tend to be of marriage, childbirth, or religious processions. Evidence suggests that this was a popular type on the eastern Aegean island of Samos and in Etruria between 560–500 BCE.

Proto-Geometric type

Examples of pyxide from the Proto-Geometric style of Greek pottery normally between roughly 1050 and 900 BCE include the globular pyxis, a type of pyxis characterized with a wide, circular body and a flared lip at the top of the vessel. Other forms of pyxide commonly from the early geometric period include the pointed pyxis is a type of pyxis characterised with a wide tip that thins into a point at the bottom.

Corinthian type

Corinthian style pyxides usually share similar traits of being less circular than traditional Greek geometric style pyxides. This can be seen in the tall convex pyxis, and the 8th century straight-sided pyxis Corinthian styles. Other forms of Corinthian pyxides include the Type II: Low Concave-sided pyxis dated around the 5th and 4th centuries BC and the Type III: High Concave-sided pyxis dated ca. late 7th century BC

== Gallery ==
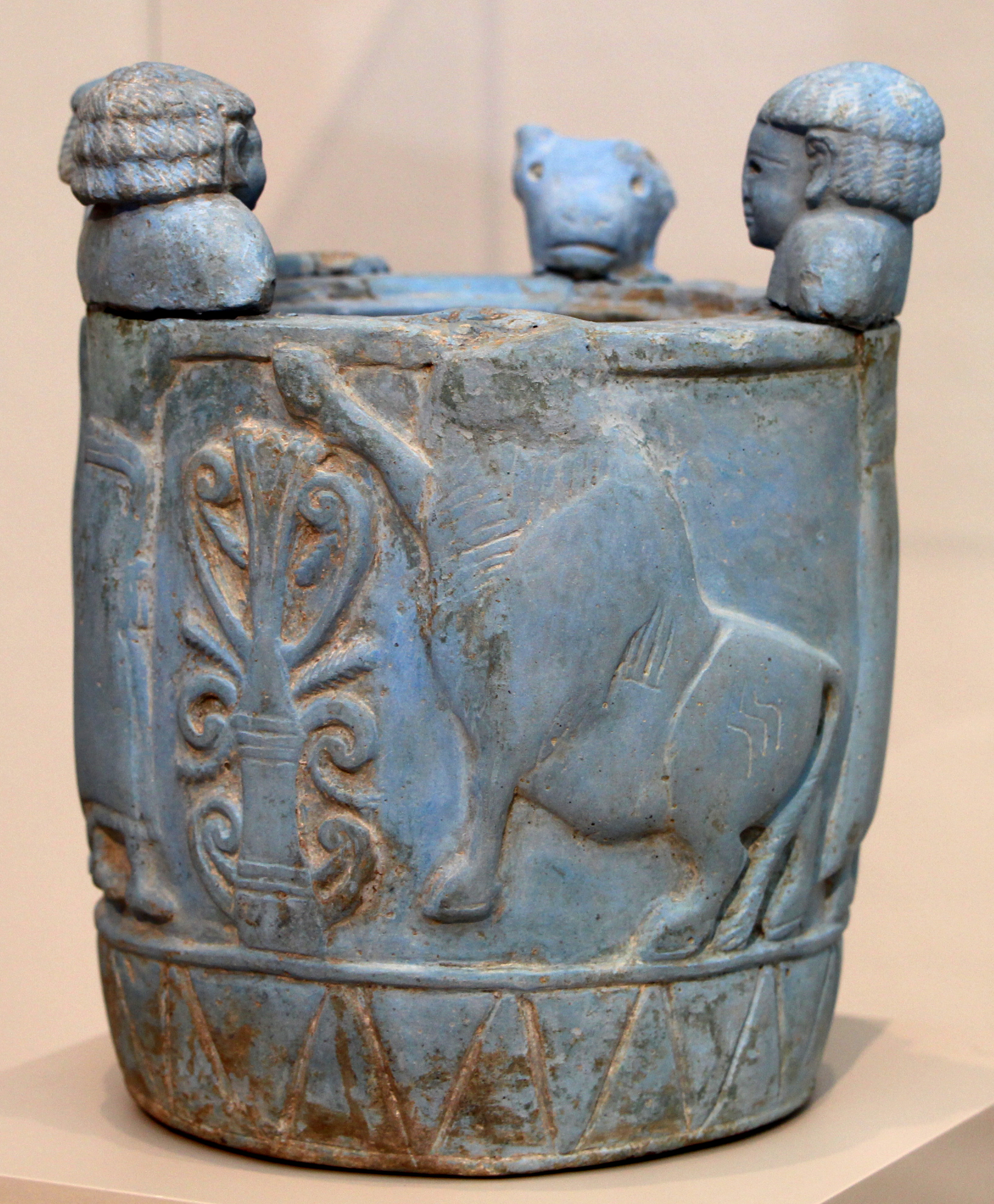
Pyxis made out of "Egyptian faience". Imported to Italy from northern Syria. Produced 750–700 BC, Altes Museum.

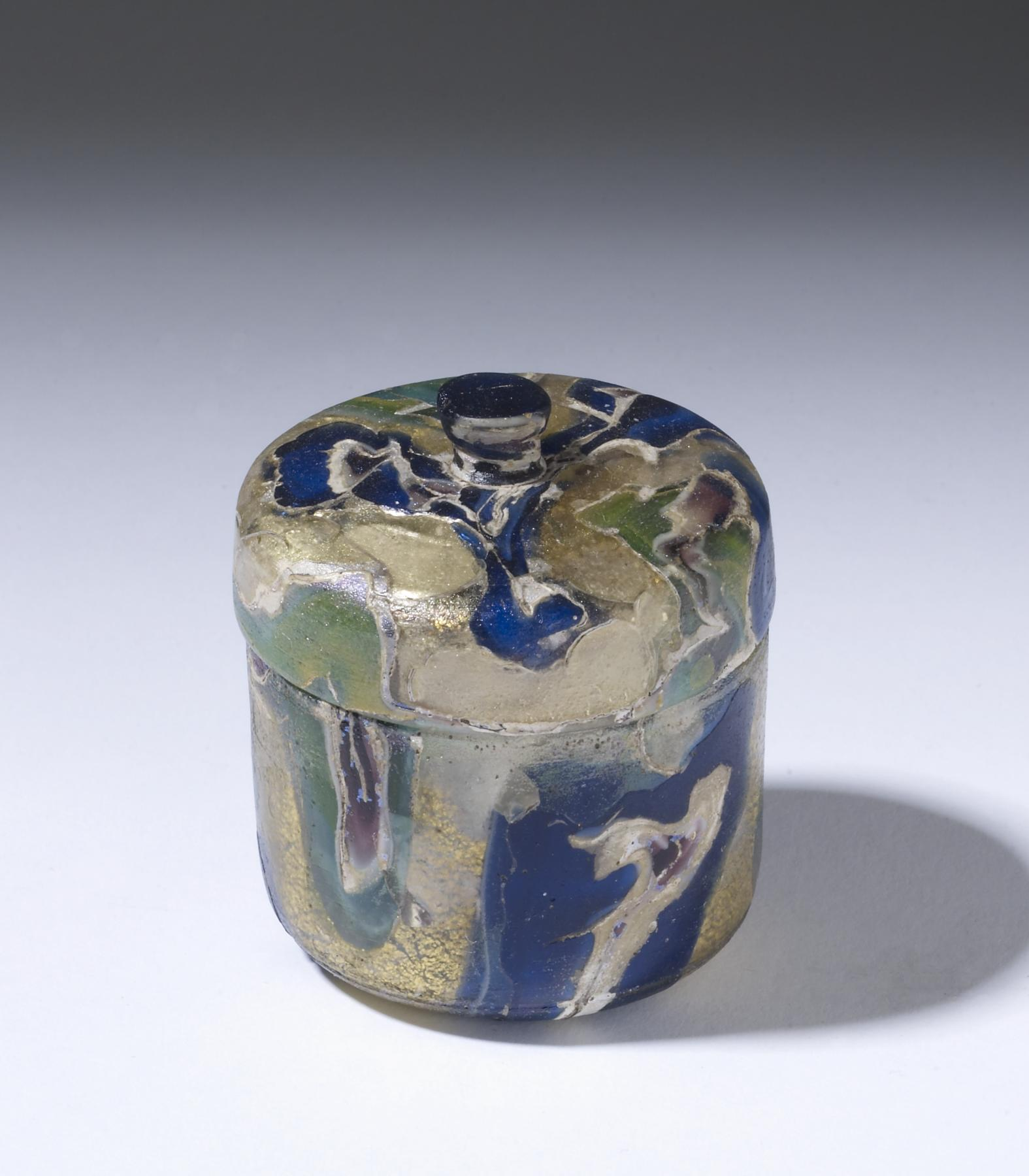
A Roman luxury Pyxis, used to hold cosmetics or precious jewellery - Walters Art Museum

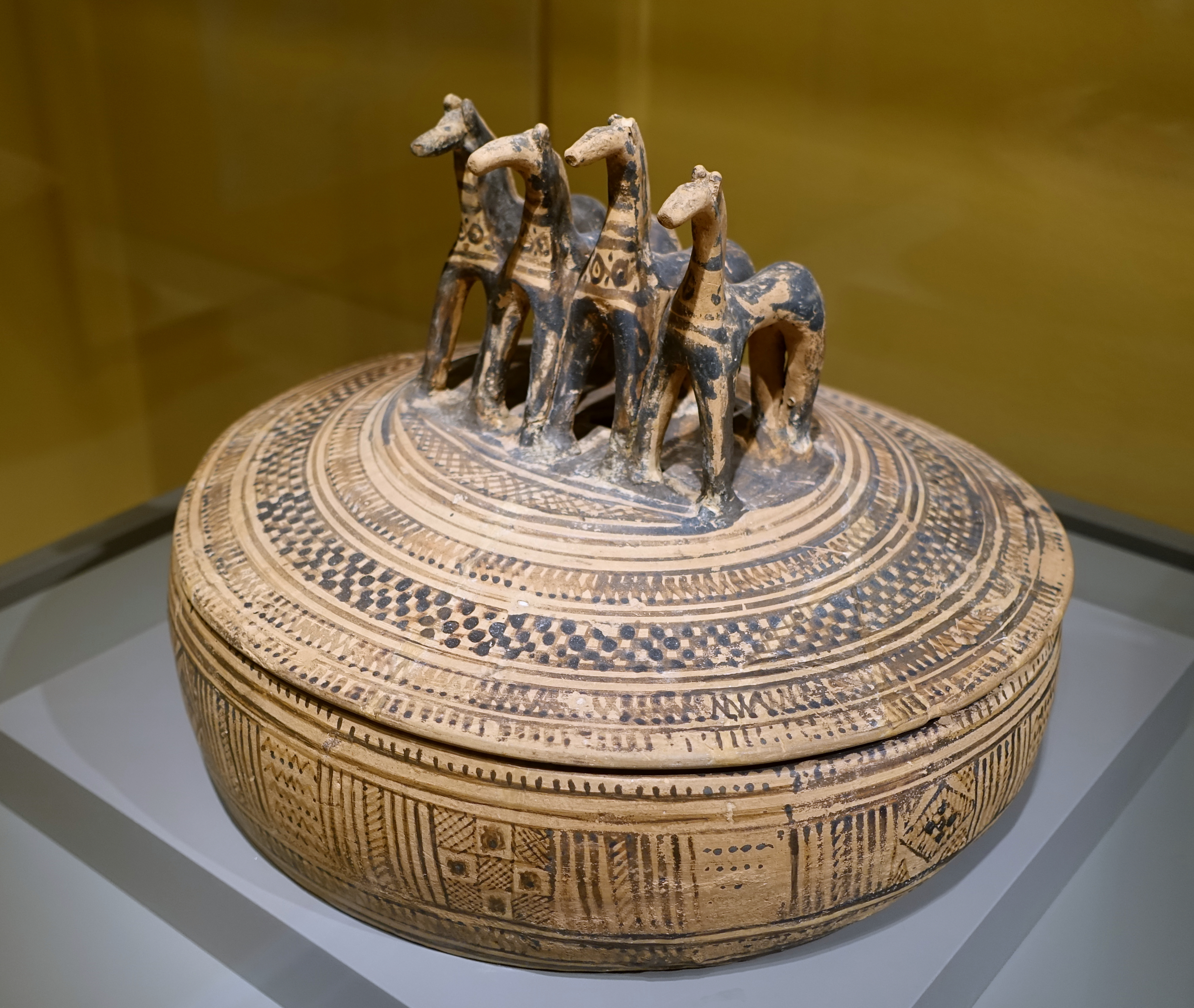
Pyxis with four horses, Greece, Attica, Geometric Period, 8th century BC, terracotta - Wadsworth Atheneum - Hartford, Connecticut

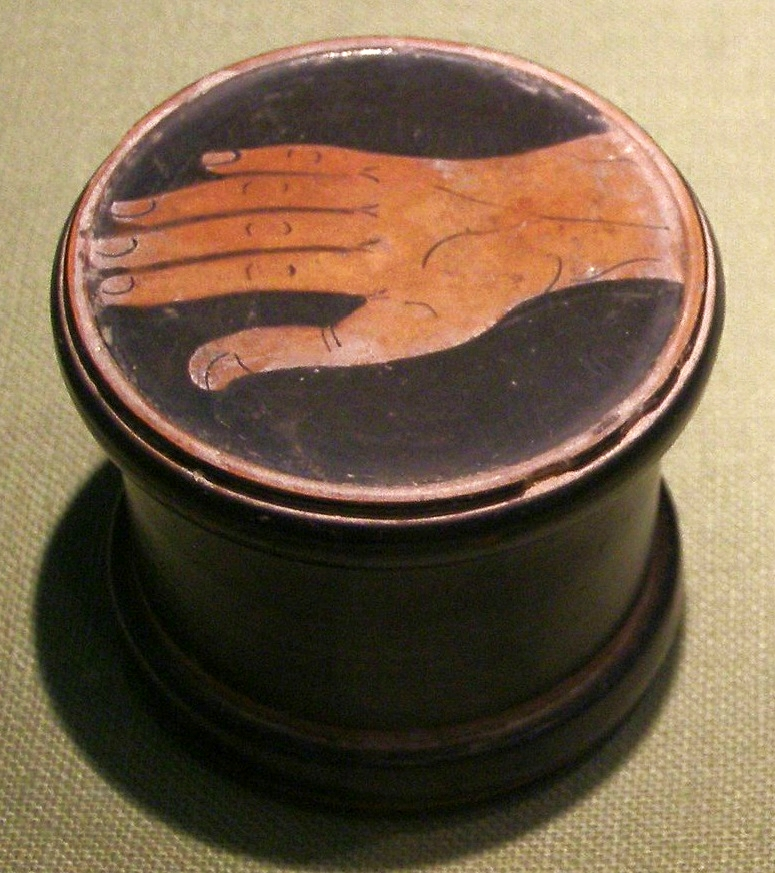
4th century "Type IV" Athenian pyxis with a depiction of a hand, National Museum, Warsaw

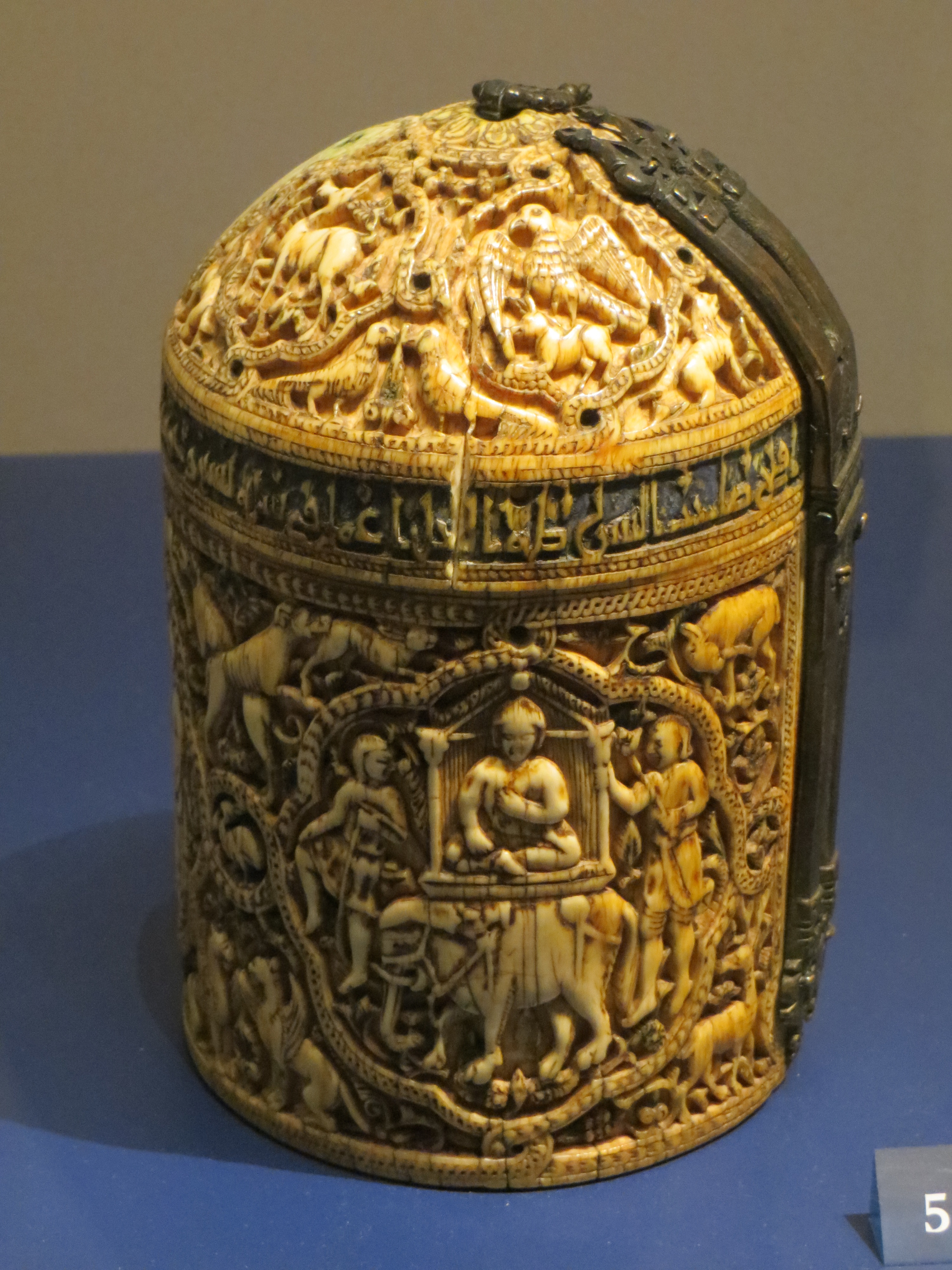
Ivory pyxis from Córdoba, Spain, 10th century AD, Victoria and Albert Museum

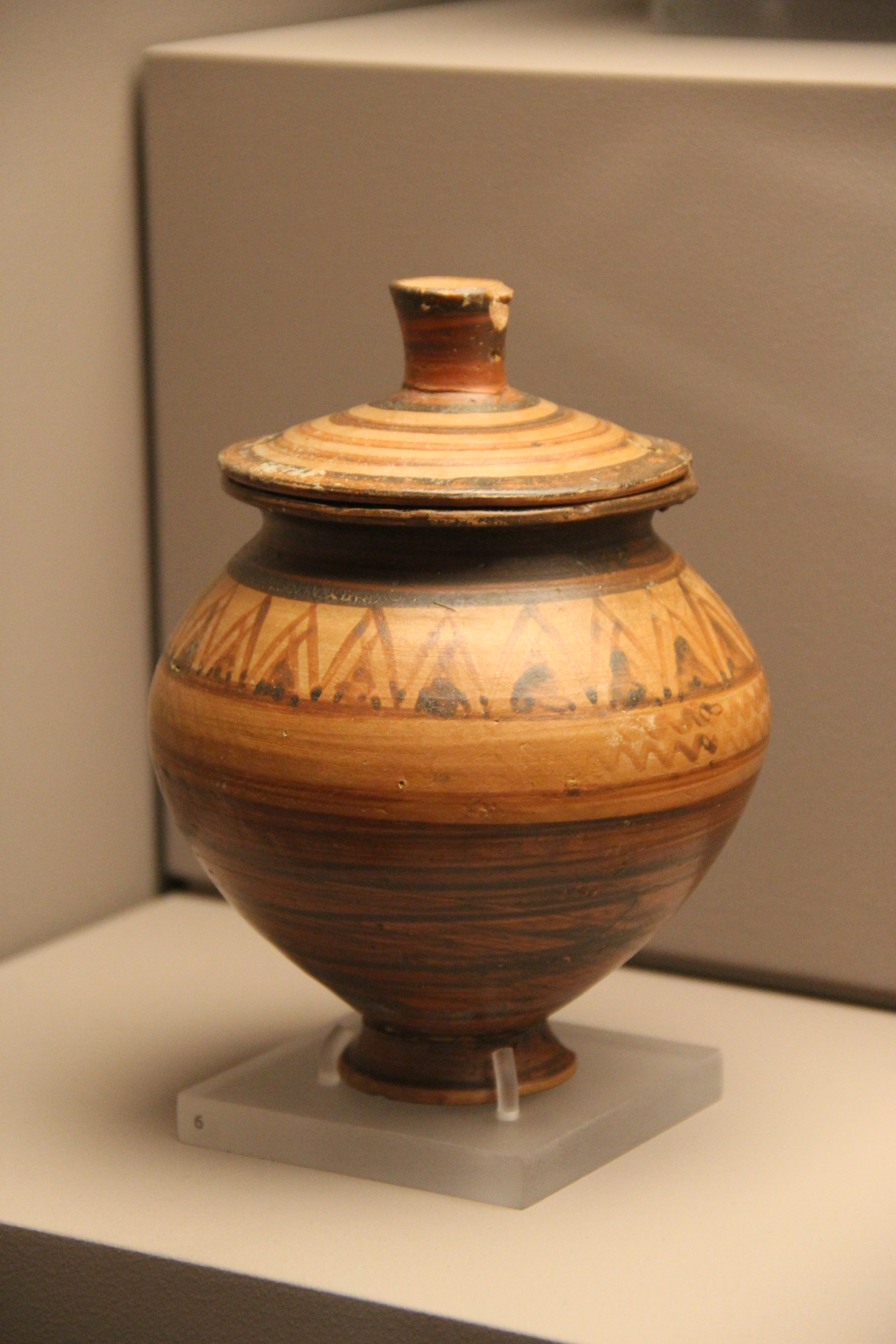
Example of a "Globular" style Pyxis - Clay pyxis with lid, Protogeometric Period, 10th c. BC

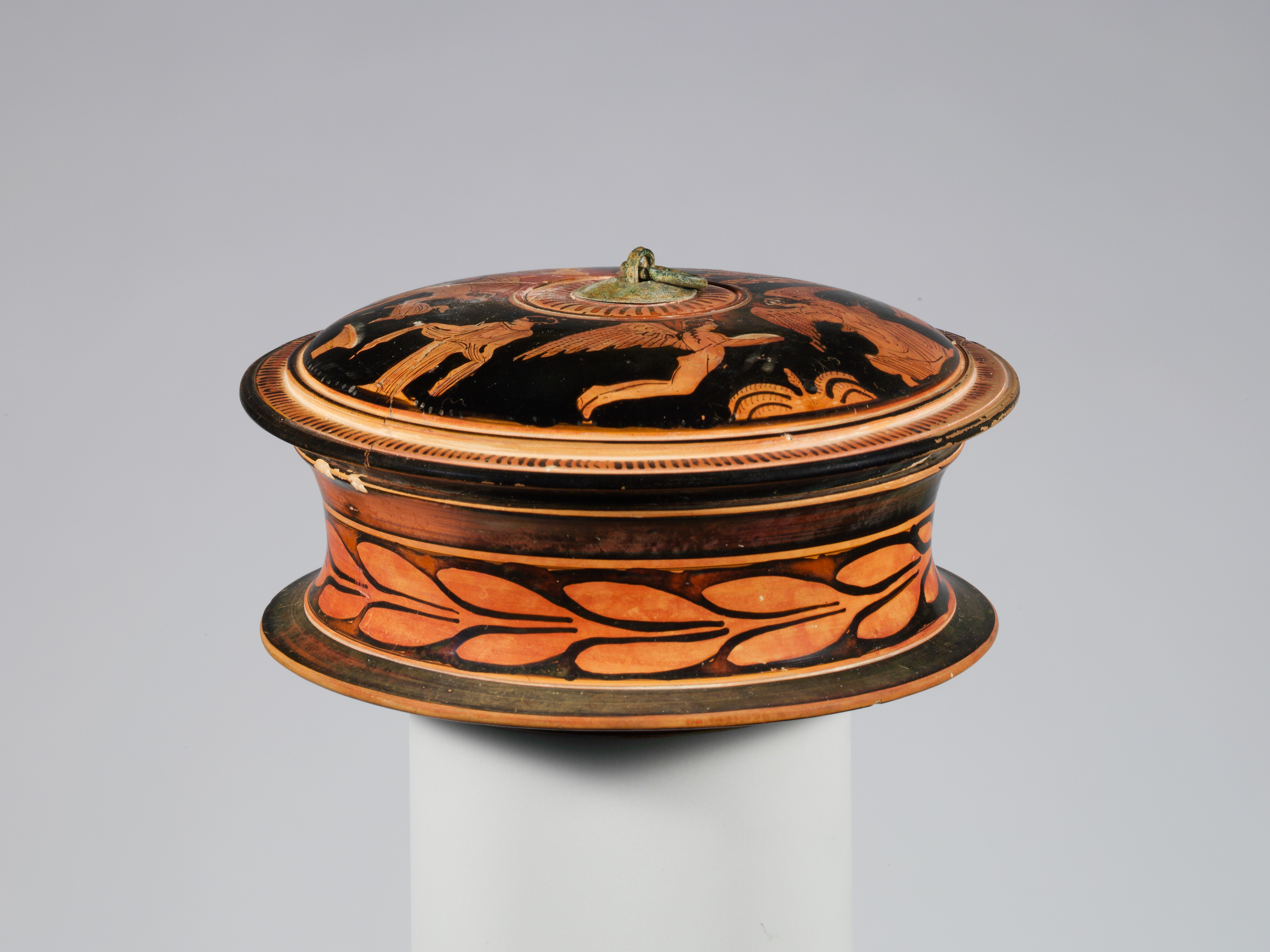
Example of a "Type II", Low Concave-sided, Pyxis c. 400 BC - Metropolitan Museum of Arts

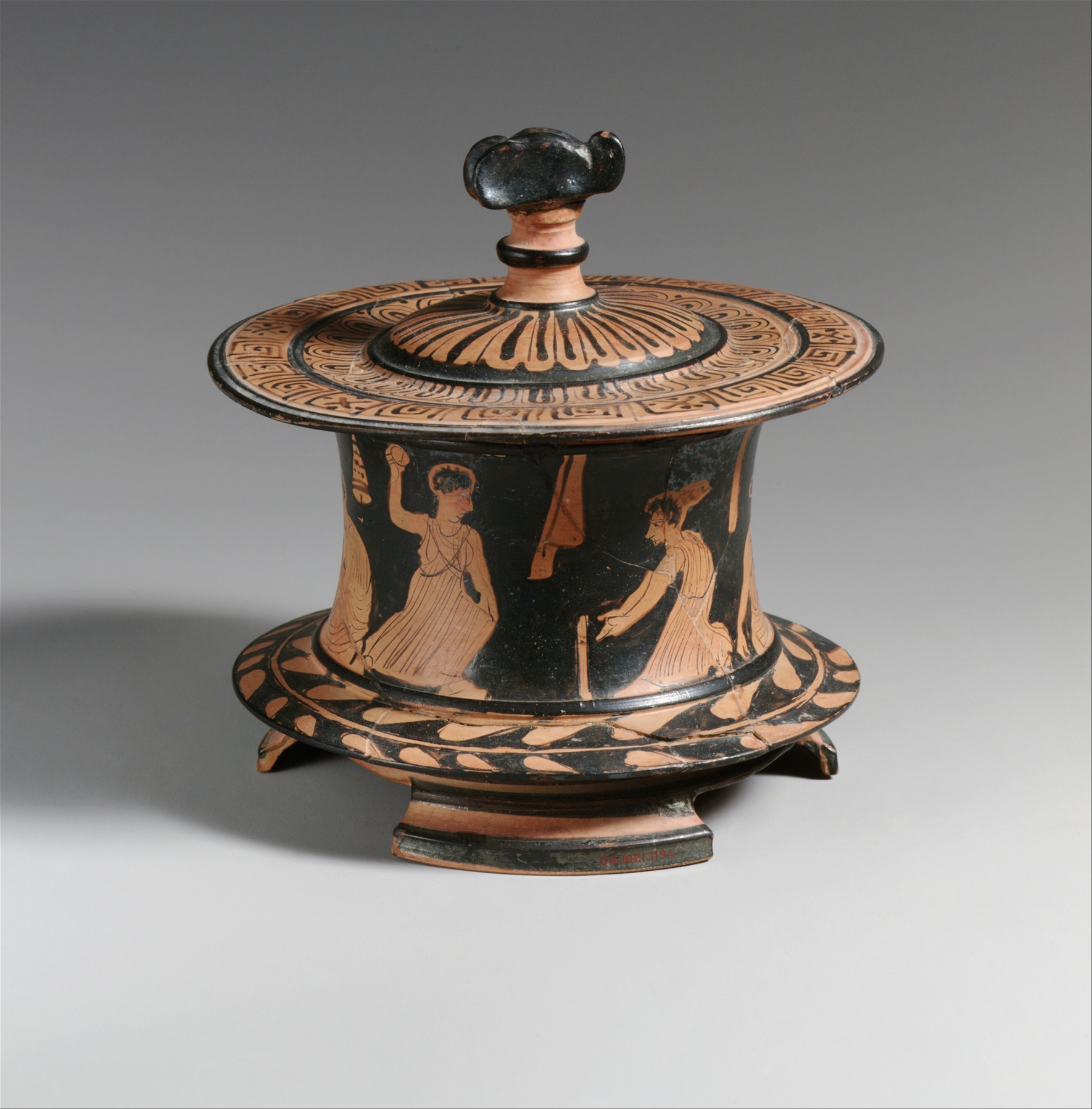
Example of a terracotta "Type III: High Concave-sided" pyxis style

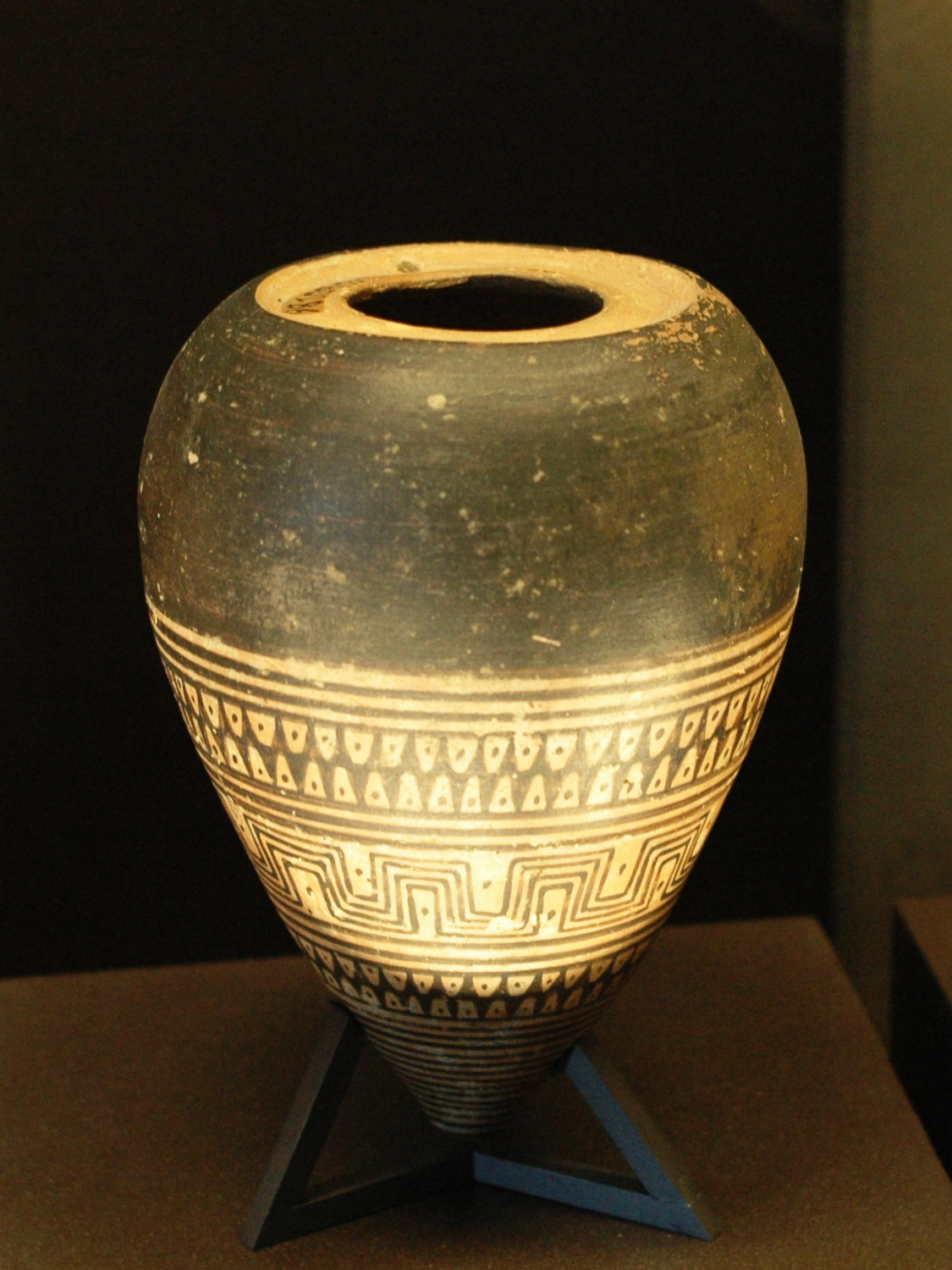
Example of a "pointed" style of pyxis, c. 900–875 BC, Louvre Museum

== See also ==
- Pyxis of Zamora
- Pyxis of al-Mughira
- Pyxis of Čierne Kľačany

== Bibliography ==
- Roberts, Sally (1978). The Attic Pyxis. Ares Publishers.
- Folsom, Robert (1967). Handbook of Greek Pottery. New York Graphic Society Ltd.
- Lyons, Claire (2009). "Nikosthenic pyxides between Etruria and Greece". In Oakley, John; Palagia, Olga (eds.). Athenian Potters and Painters Volume II. Oxbow Books. pp. 166–180. ISBN 978-1-84217-350-3.
- Sparkes, Brian A. (1991). Greek Pottery: An Introduction. Manchester; New York: Manchester University Press; New York: Distributed exclusively in the US and Canada by St. Martin's Press
- Dickinson, Oliver (1994). The Aegean Bronze Age. Cambridge University Press
