= Museum of Navarre, Pamplona =

Museum in Pamplona, Navarre, Spain

Museum of Navarre
- Nafarroako Museoa
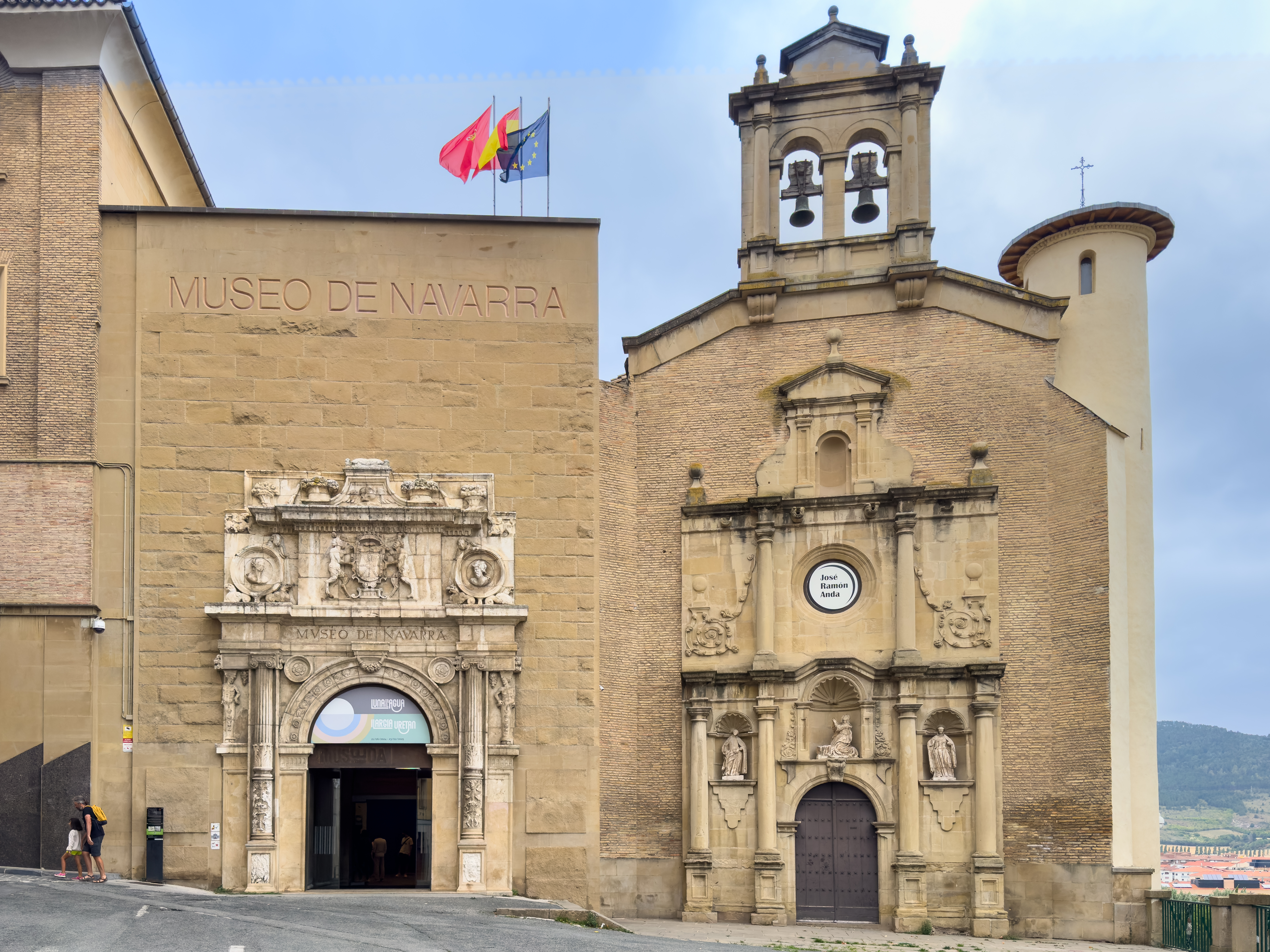
- Established: 24 June 1956
- Location: Pamplona, Pamplona, Spain
- Coordinates: 42°49′10″N 1°38′47″W
- Type: museum
- Website: museodenavarra.navarra.es/es/
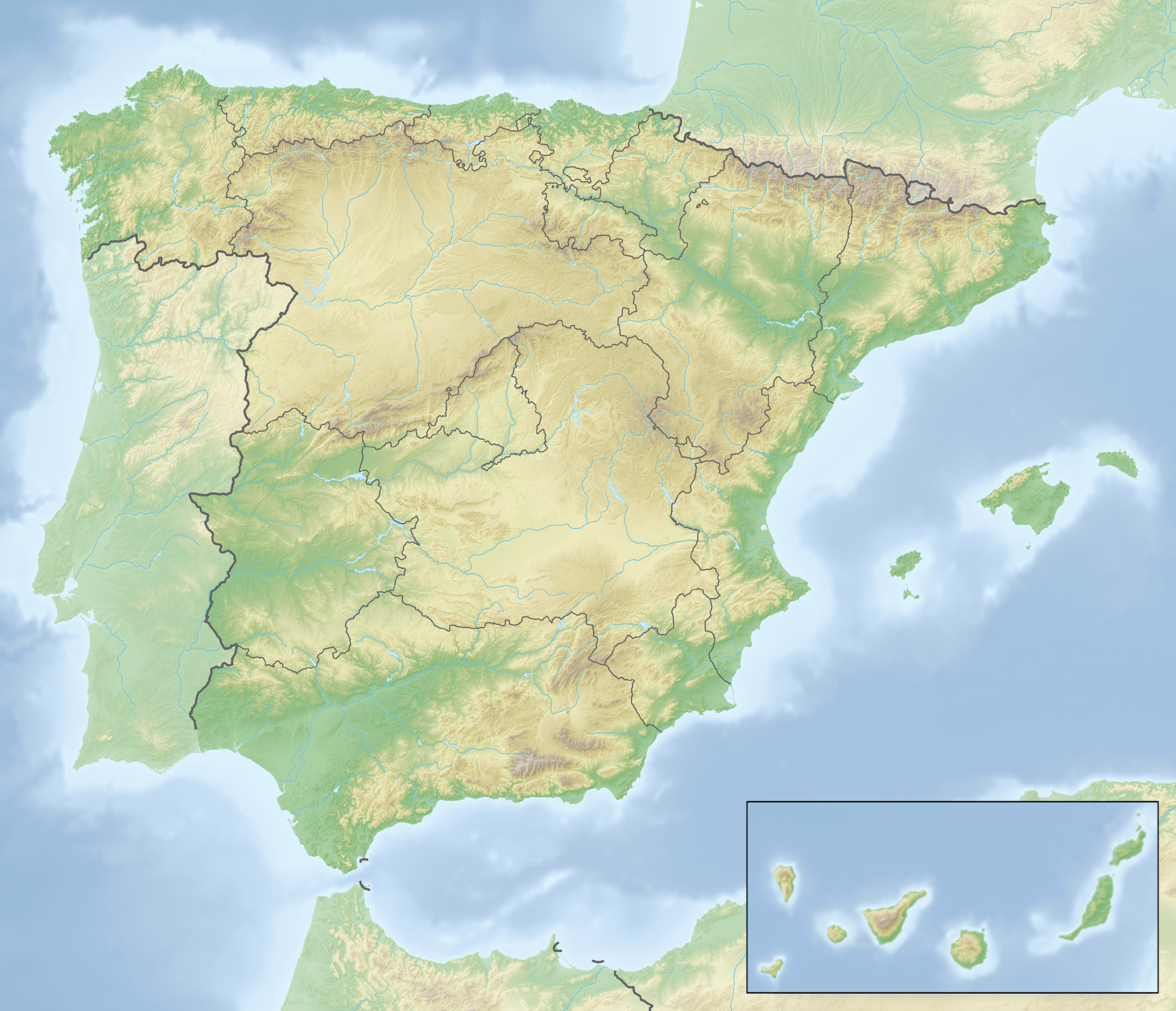
- Location of Museum of Navarre, Pamplona

The Museum of Navarra (Spanish: Museo de Navarra; Basque: Nafarroako Museoa) is the art museum of Navarre, and is located on Calle Cuesta Santo Domingo in Pamplona, in the Navarre province of Spain.

== History ==
The museum is sited in the old hospital of 16th-century Nuestra Señora de la Misericordia de Pamplona, converted to museum only in 1956. The origins of the collection are works obtained by a provincial Commission in 1844, and displayed in 1910 at what is now the Cámara de los Comptos. To the right of the entrance is the facade of the church of the hospital.

The exhibits in the four story museum is chronologically arranged, starting from prehistoric works to the 20th-century. Among its collections are:

- The “Mapa de Abauntz”, a prehistoric engraving on a block with geographic signs
- Triumph of Bacchus first-century mosaic from the Ancient Roman town of Andelos, near Mendigorría
- Romanesque capitals of the ancient cathedral of Pamplona
- The Leyre Casket, an ivory Mozarabic chest (1004/5)
- Romanesque murals from San Martín in Artaíz
- Romanesque murals from belfry of San Pedro de Olite
- Murals from San Saturnino in Artajona
- Gothic Murals (1330) from the Refectory of the Cathedral of Pamplona by Juan Oliver
- Murals from Gallipienzo and Olleta
- Grisaille Renaissance Murals from the Palacio de Óriz depicting the War in Saxony of Charles V
- Statue of San Jerónimo by Juan de Anchieta
- Ecce Homo attributed to Luis de Morales
- Paintings by Vicente Berdusán
- Coronation of the Virgin by Francisco Camilo
- Annunciation by Francisco de Lizona
- San José by Alonso del Arco
- Immaculate Conception by Francisco Ignacio Ruiz de la Iglesia
- Still-life with Fish by school of Mateo Cerezo
- Story of Genesis (1700), twelve paintings on copper by the Flemish Jacob Bouttats,
- Portrait of Leandro Fernández de Moratín (c. 1790) painted by Luis Paret
- Portrait of the Marquis of San Adrián by Goya

In addition the museum displays works by artists from or active in Navarre such as Javier Ciga, Jesús Basiano, Gerardo Sacristán, Caro, Jorge Oteiza, Julio Martín Royo, Salaberri, Aquerreta or Manterola. The church is used to display retablos and religious art.
