= Čierne Kľačany =

Čierne Kľačany Feketekelecsény
- Municipality
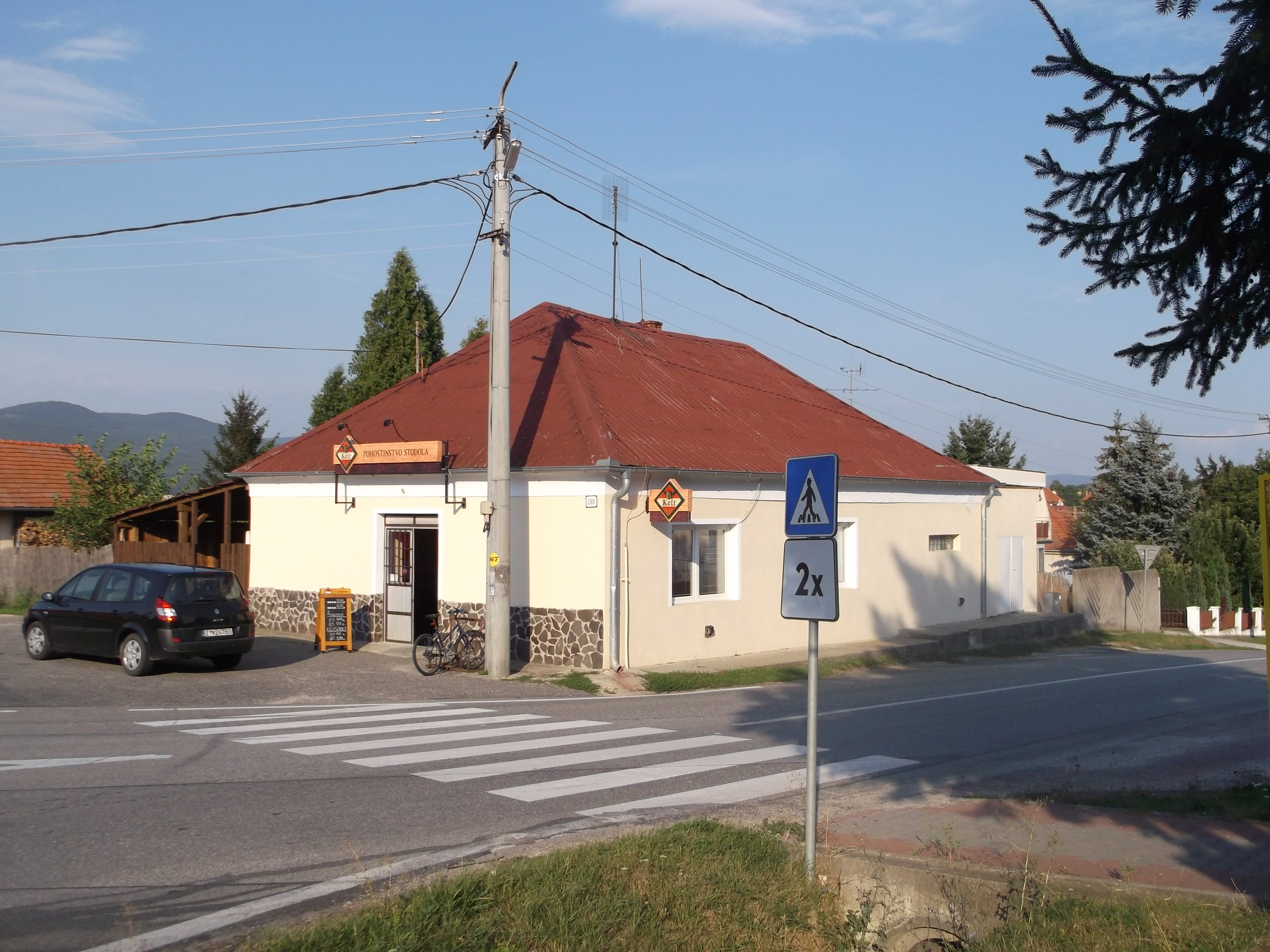

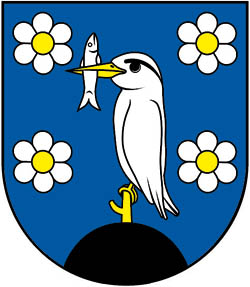
- Flag Coat of arms

- Location of Čierne Kľačany in the Nitra Region Location of Čierne Kľačany in Slovakia
- Coordinates: 48.38°N 18.40°E
- Country: Slovakia
- Region: Nitra Region
- District: Zlaté Moravce District
- First mentioned: 1209

Area
  - Total: 10.97 km^{2} (4.24 sq mi)
- Elevation: 224 m (735 ft)

Population (2025)
  - Total: 1,135
- Time zone: UTC+1 (CET)
  - Summer (DST): UTC+2 (CEST)
- Postal code: 953 05
- Area code: +421 37
- Vehicle registration plate (until 2022): ZM
- Website: www.cierneklacany.sk

Čierne Kľačany (Hungarian: Feketekelecsény) is a village and municipality in Zlaté Moravce District of the Nitra Region, of Slovakia. It is best known for the archaeological find of the Pyxis of Čierne Kľačany.

== History ==
In historical records the village was first mentioned in 1209.

== Geography ==
The municipality lies at an altitude of 224 metres (735 ft) and covers an area of 10.97 km^{2} (4.24 sq mi) (2025).

== Population ==
Population statistic (10 years)
Year	1995	2005	2015	2025
Count	1130	1126	1128	1135
Difference		−0.35%	+0.17%	+0.62%

Population statistic
Year	2024	2025
Count	1158	1135
Difference		−1.98%

It has a population of 1135 people (31 December 2025).

=== Ethnicity ===
Census 2021 (1+%)
Ethnicity	Number	Fraction
Slovak	1148	98.28%
Not found out	13	1.11%
Total	1168	

In year 2021 was 1168 people by ethnicity 1148 as Slovak, 13 as Not found out, 7 as Czech, 6 as Hungarian, 2 as Other, 1 as Jewish, 1 as Romani, 1 as Rusyn and 1 as Russian.

Note on population: The difference values of population numbers in the table "Population statistic" and in the sections "Ethnicity" & "Religion" is caused by the use of various statistical methods.

=== Religion ===
Census 2021 (1+%)
Religion	Number	Fraction
Roman Catholic Church	1030	88.18%
None	95	8.13%
Not found out	18	1.54%
Total	1168	

In year 2021 was 1168 people by religion 1030 from Roman Catholic Church, 95 from None, 18 from Not found out, 8 from Greek Catholic Church, 4 from Christian Congregations in Slovakia, 3 from Other, 2 from Calvinist Church, 2 from Eastern Orthodox Church, 2 from Paganism and natural spirituality, 1 from Evangelical Church, 1 from Seventh-day Adventist Church, 1 from Church of Jesus Christ of Latter-day Saints and 1 from Ad hoc movements.

== Facilities ==
The village has a small public library and football pitch.

== Genealogical resources ==
The records for genealogical research are available at the state archive "Statny Archiv in Nitra, Slovakia"

- Roman Catholic church records (births/marriages/deaths): 1716-1896 (parish B)

== See also ==
- List of municipalities and towns in Slovakia
