= San Pedro, Olite =

Church in Olite, Spain

Coordinates: 42.4802°N 1.6481°W

San Pedro is a Romanesque and Gothic-style, Roman Catholic church, located on Calle El Fosal 2 in Olite, region of Navarre, Spain.

== History ==
Construction of the church began in the 12th century but continued over the next centuries, creating a hybrid of structures. It is located adjacent to the castle-like Royal Palace of Olite. The 52-meter-high Gothic bell-tower is capped by a pointed roof, and is known as Torre Aguja or "Needle Tower". The murals in the bell-tower were moved to the Museo de Navarre (the Museum of Navarre in Pamplona).

The main portal is highly decorated including with scenes of St George and the Dragon and a centaur fighting a harpy. The tympanum is a later addition, depicting Saints Peter, Andrew and James. The lintel depicts scenes of the life of Saint Peter. The facade has a Gothic rose window.

North of the church is a cloister with decorated Gothic columns. Some of the capitals depict scenes from Genesis.

The main retablo is dedicated to Saint Peter, and was completed in Baroque style. The canvases of Saint Fermín and Saint Francis Xavier are by Vicente Berdusán. The Chapel of the Virgen del Campanal was frescoed in the 13th century. These works are now preserved in the Museum of Navarre.

Inside the church is the tomb monument of the notary Enequo Pinel, built in 1432. A polychrome alabaster relief depicts the Trinity with three persons. The decorations were sculpted by Jean Lome de Tournay, sculptor for the court of Charles III of Navarre.
