= Pyxis of Čierne Kľačany =

Byzantine jewel box

The Pyxis of Čierne Kľačany (Slovak: Čiernokľačianska pyxida) is an oval-shaped jewel box (i.e. a pyxis) made of ivory. Several fragments were found in an intact tomb near the village of Čierne Kľačany in Slovakia in 1974 by a group of boys and locals. The artifact was subsequently reconstructed from the fragments.

== History ==
The artifact is dated from the end of the 9th century, although it was probably made in the 4th century. There are only a few similar objects in the entire world. It is believed that the box was a gift for the ruler Rastislav of Moravia, brought during the times of Saints Cyril and Methodius (second half of 9th century) from the Byzantine Empire.

The artifact depicts scenes of daily life, such as people farming on fields and breeding animals. It shows the legend of the founding of Rome. The artifact was found in pieces, some of which have never been found. Some copies of the box have been made; one of them was donated to Pope John Paul II in November 2003. The original is conserved in Bratislava Castle. A memorial stone was laid by Matica slovenská in 1993 in the area where the artifact had originally been found.
