= Pyxis of al-Mughira =

Ivory carved container

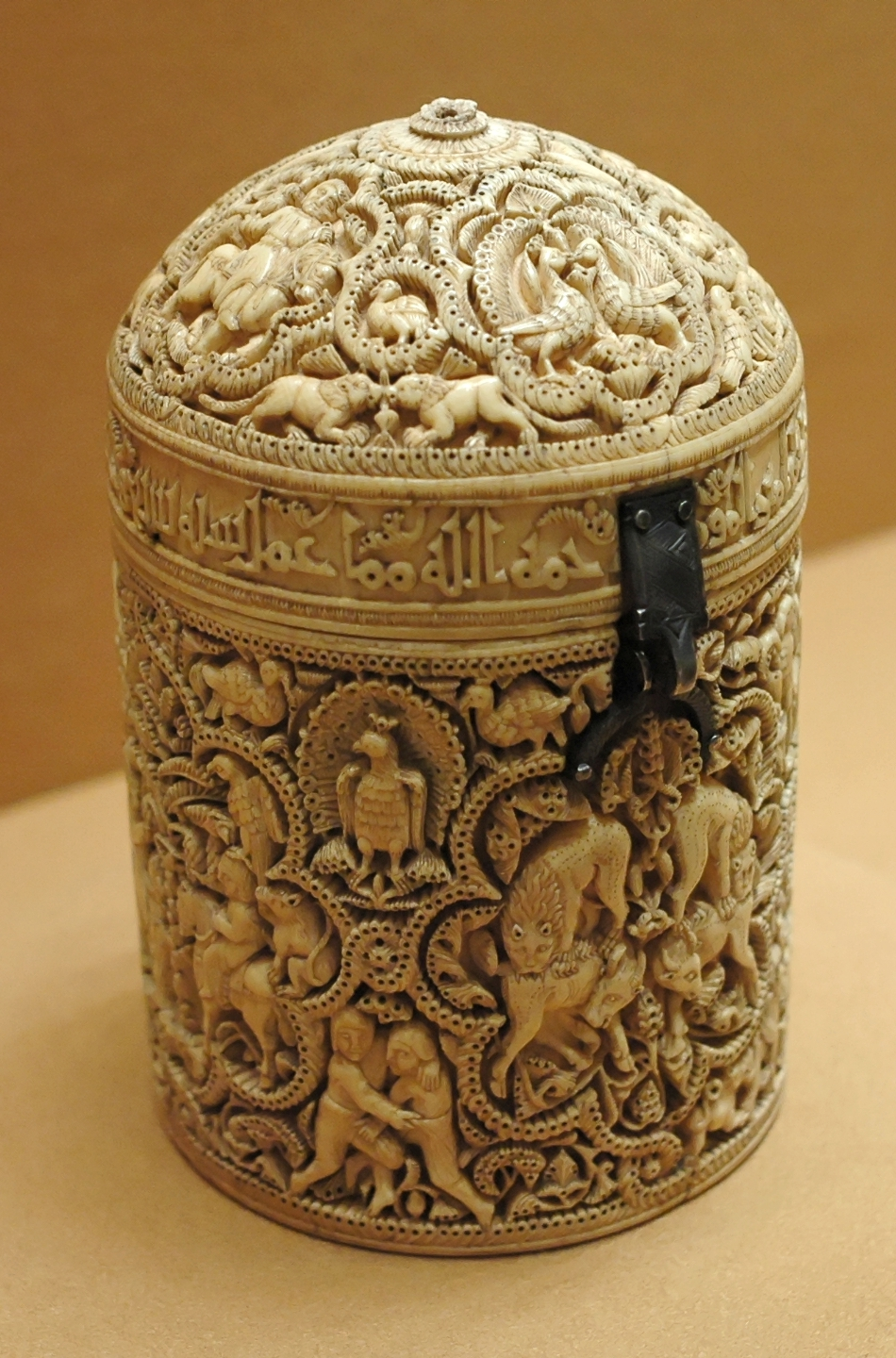
Pyxis of al-Mughira. 968 CE/357AH. 15cm x 8cm

The pyxis made in 968 CE/357AH for Prince al-Mughira (15 cm $\times$8 cm) is a portable carved ivory container that dates from medieval Islam's Spanish Umayyad period. It is in the collection of the Louvre in Paris. The container was made in one of the Madinat al-Zahra workshops, near modern-day Cordoba, Spain and is thought to have been a coming-of-age present for the son of caliph 'Abd al-Rahman III. Historical sources say that the prince referred to as al-Mughira was Abu al-Mutarrif al-Mughira, the last born son of the caliph ‘Abd al-Rahman III, born to a concubine named Mushtaq. It is certain this pyxis belongs to al-Mughira because of the inscription around the base of the lid which reads: "Blessing from God, goodwill, happiness and prosperity to al-Mughīra, son of the Commander of the Faithful, may God's mercy [be upon him], made in the year 357."

== Physicality and historical context ==
Pyxides are known as luxury personal vessels given to members of the royal family and are thought to have been used for holding precious gems, jewelry, aromas, perfume etc.; however, the actual purpose of the pyxis of al-Mughira is unknown because there are no traces of any substance on the interior. Though the entire surface of the pyxis is intricately and expertly carved with different forms of decoration, most attention lies within the four main medallions around its circumference.

The exterior of the pyxis is elaborately carved and incised elephant ivory, imported by the caliph from North Africa. It is possible the pyxis was originally inlaid with gold and silver but only traces of jade remain. Though discovered with metal hinges mounting the lid on the container, it is believed that the mounts were placed later than the original creation date because no space was allowed for them. This is known because the hinges destroy part of the inscription. Due to these mentioned uncertainties, it is unclear how the lid was intended to be situated on the vessel and thus unknown how the inscription should be read, what is considered front or back and what its relation is to the scenes below.

When the second Umayyad caliph died, and his brother was assassinated after his death, the new ruler of al-Andalus was in question. The Umayyad court chronicler Ibn Hayyān recalls two factions coming together to choose between Umayyad caliph al-Hakam II's son, Hishām, or ʿAbd al-Rahmān III's youngest son. Hishām and al-Mughīra both had a faction; Hishām's faction was composed of his mother, Subn, al-Mushafī, and Ibn Abī ʿĀmir. al-Mughīra's fraction was composed of eunuchs; some of the eunuchs were part of the last two caliphs’ inner circle. Glaire D. Anderson writes that the eunuchs who were present when al-Hakam died, without a second thought, pushed al-Mughīra to the throne.

== The Medallions ==
The decoration on the surface of the pyxis is arranged in four eight-lobed medallions that have a specific look of interwoven borders. Medallions are known to represent a figural scene using smaller figures with a vegetal background and some including animals having a meaning behind it. The medallions are read from right to left to correctly understand the chronological sequence of events.

Medallion One shows a musical court scene of two seated figures flanking a middle figure who is suspected to be a servant due to his smaller, secondary scale. One figure holds the braided specter and flask of the Umayyads, while the other holds a fan. The meaning of this medallion is quite controversial but a popular viewpoint argues that the man with the specter and flask symbolizes the Umayyad Caliph and the figure with the fan symbolizes the Abbasids. It is argued by Francisco Prado-Vilar that this scene could represent a ceremony performed in the court of al-Hakam II that would be of political significance to al-Mughira and act as a reminder to him of the continuation and solidity of the dynasty.

Medallion Two is of two horse riders picking clusters of dates from a date-palm tree. These trees are primarily found in the Middle East and North Africa and may allude to the Eastern lands, or "homeland of the palm tree groves", lost to the Abbasids—the dynasty that established Baghdad and overthrew the Syrian Umayyads. Abd al-Rahman I, who founded Umayyad rule in the Iberian Peninsula, used the tree as code in his poetry. Francisco Prado-Vilar discusses how the palm tree serves as a vegetal analogy for human reproduction, reflecting the theme of fertility found throughout the pyxis's imagery. The symbolic purpose behind the date harvesting demonstrates how cutting off the male flower cluster before the stamens ripen allows it to reach the flowers of the female tree.

Medallion Three displays a scene of two men gathering eggs from falcon nests, which is popularly seen as a symbol for Umayyad power or legitimacy. Scholars have claimed that the synchronism between the falcon and Umayyad power was a current and strong symbol due to such metaphors found in poetry and art during that time period. In particular, ‘Abd al-Rahman I al-Dakhil, founder of the Umayyads in al-Andalus, was famously named “the falcon of the Quraysh” by an Abbasid caliph. Because both men are being bitten by dogs it is also suggested that this was an implication of threat to those who would try to grasp power.

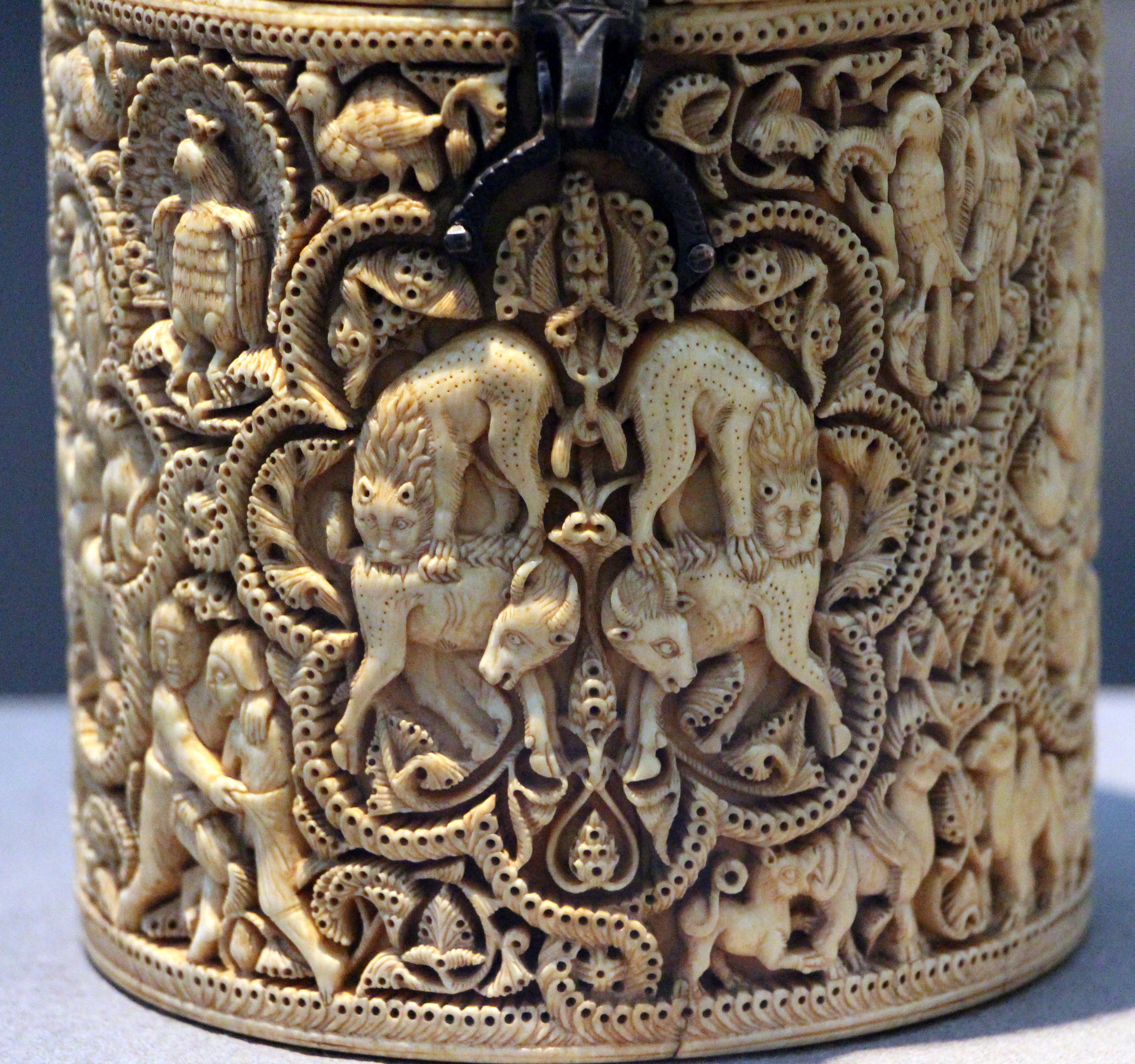
Detail of the fourth medallion, showing a fight between lion and bull

Medallion Four is the only medallion that shows a common symbol of power through an image of a bull and lion fighting. Some scholars, including those at the Louvre and Eva Baer, have interpreted this as a message of authority and legitimacy of Umayyad Caliphs in competition with the Abbasid Caliphs, who ruled in Baghdad. Prado-Vilar ties this scene to fables told at the time that were used to teach life lessons to the young, especially to family of the royal court. He claims that, keeping Kalila wa Dimna in mind, al-Mughira would reflect on the symbolism of the “tragic consequences of listening to evil advice of those plotting to have him conspire against his brother’s lineage”; a way for the caliph to keep him in his secondary role and to not attempt to seek reign.

== Interpretation controversy ==
Scholars like Renata Holod argue that the pyxis was a present given to al-Mughira with an ironic, comical edge as a reminder to him that he would never be the next in line for rule. Holod also suspects the gift was not from the caliph or commissioned by al-Mughira; however, scholars like Makariou who refute this claim argue that it would be difficult for someone other than royalty to commission such a highly expensive item and to solely focus to a purely ironic message does not lead anywhere. Makariou's arguments also conflict with those of Prado-Vilar, who focuses solely on the pyxis as a vessel of serious warning to al-Mughira regarding his potential political goals; however, Makariou contends that this argument shows a lack of knowledge concerning medieval caliphate customs and that it was not in the nature of the caliph to be so deeply concerned with internal power struggles.

The actual purpose of the pyxis of al-Mughira remains a subject of debate and is ultimately unknown. According to Glaire D. Anderson, the events that are speculated to be depicted on the pyxis are not likely to be related to any events that would have unfolded years later. Anderson also argues that the pyxis was most likely commissioned by al-Mushtaq, consort of Abd al-Rahman III, for her son and reinforces this argument by making connections to how al-Mushtaq's wealth directly connected her to Umayyad ateliers. Makariou argued that the pyxis was commissioned as a coming of age gift, however, Anderson rebuts this by explaining that gifts of that sort would be given to youths around the ages of thirteen or fourteen and not eighteen, which would have been the age of al-Mughira at the time. Although ivory was a valuable and difficult material to work with, using it to create the pyxis of al-Mughira is viewed by some as worldly due to its leisurely context of princely entertainment; nevertheless, the vessel exhibits impeccable craftsmanship and expert design. To date the pyxis of al-Mughira's purpose is still speculated and debated. It is currently a part of the Islamic art collection at the Louvre in Paris.

== Related pieces ==
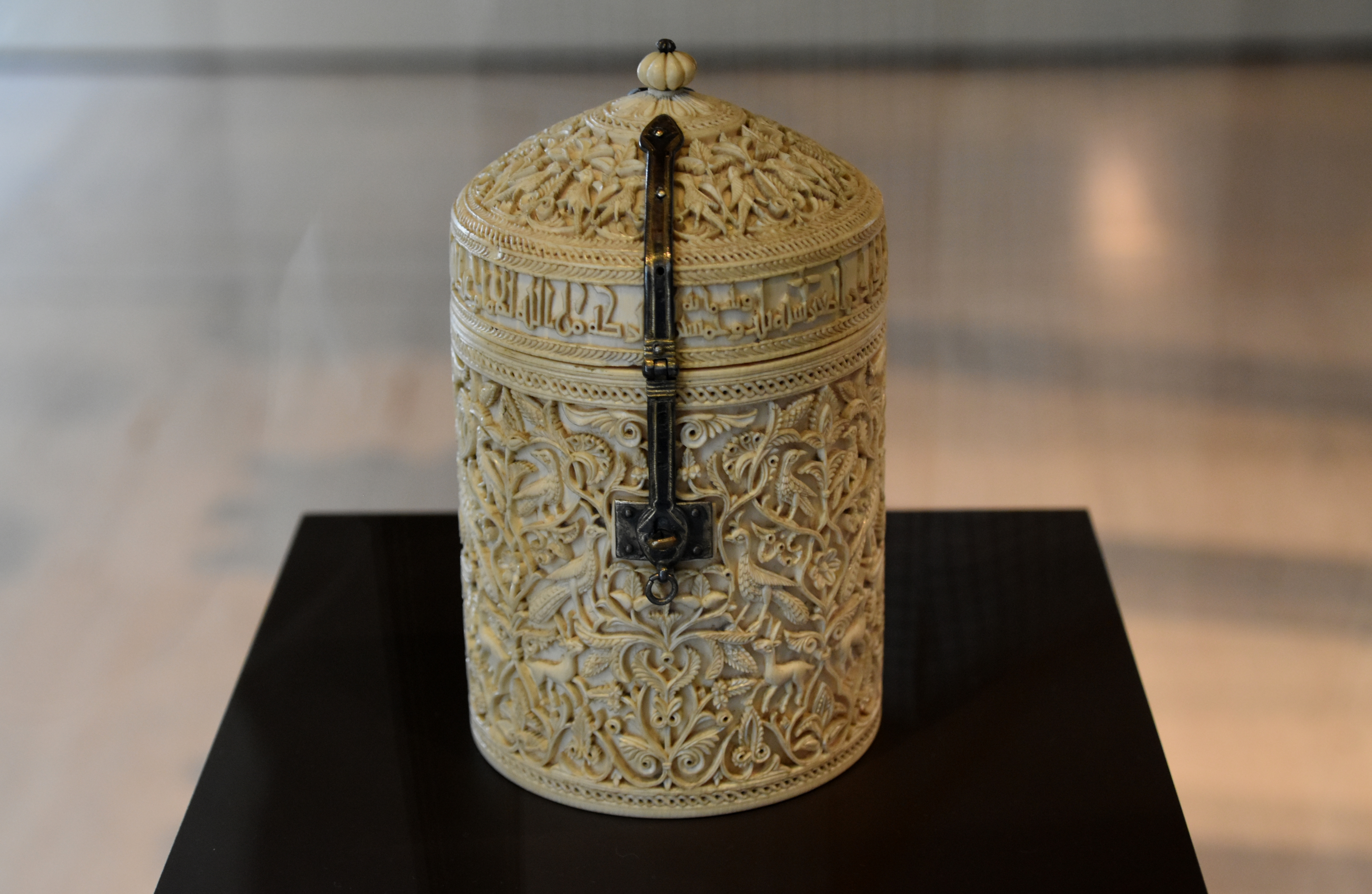
The Pyxis of Zamora

The Pyxis of al-Mughira and the Pyxis of Zamora share many characteristics. Both objects are luxury items from Spain. These objects represented political power and refinement, as the ivory from which they were carved was affordable only to the wealthy. Much like the Pyxis of al-Mughira, the Pyxis of Zamora was used to hold jewelry and perfumes. The Pyxis of Zamora also includes animals such as the peacock and gazelle, while the Pyxis of al-Mughira has bulls, lions, and horses.

== See also ==
- Leyre Casket
