= Leyre Casket =

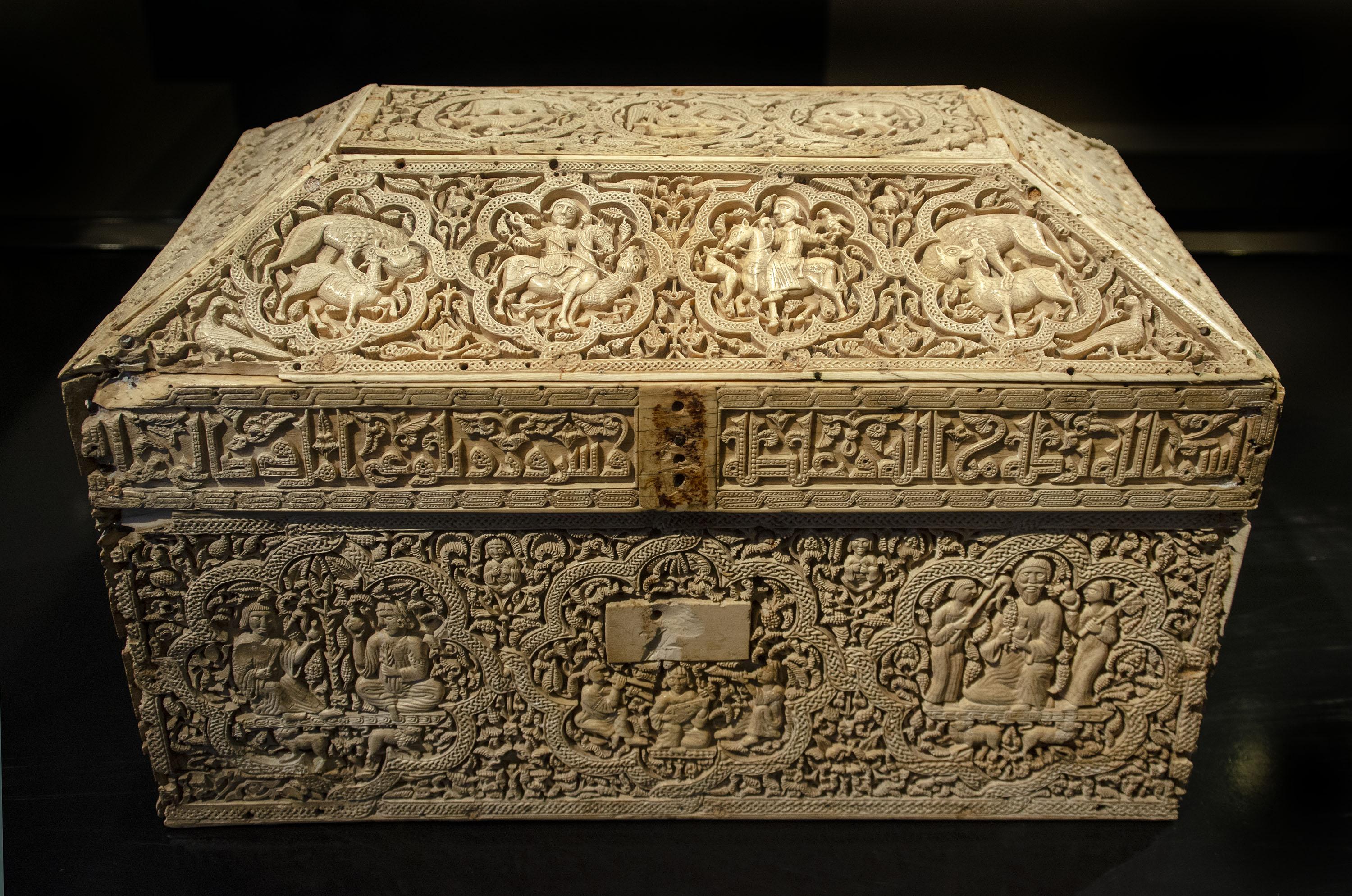
Front face of the Leyre Casket.

The Leyre Casket (Arqueta de Leyre, Museo de Navarra inventory number 1360-B, also known as the Leire Casket, Pamplona Casket) is one of the jewels of Hispano-Arab Islamic art. It is a casket or reliquary made of elephant ivory which was made in 1004/5 in the Caliphate of Cordoba.

== Form ==
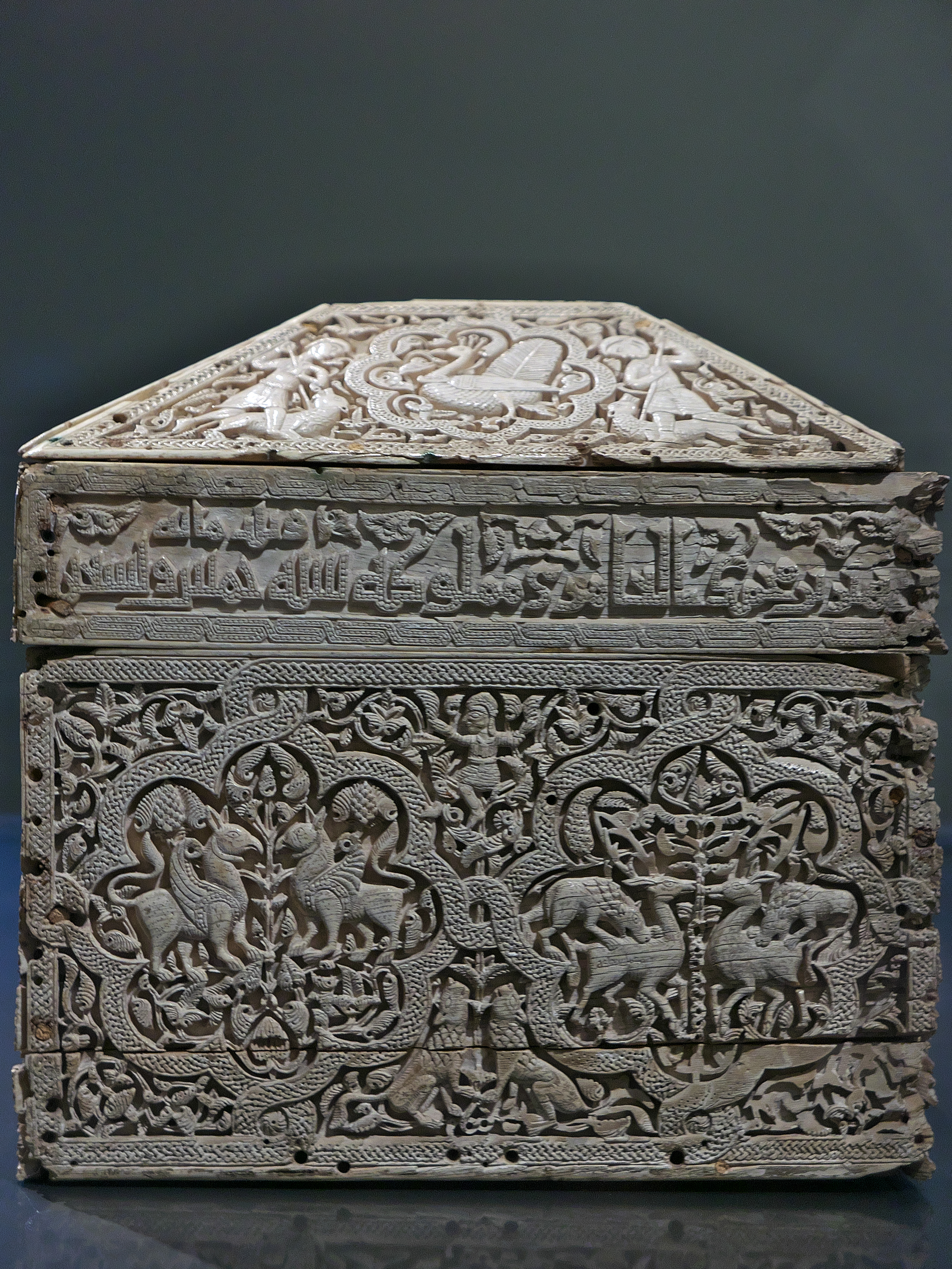
Left-hand panel of the casket.

The casket takes the following form:

- Shape: rectangular, with a truncated pyramidal lid.
- Material: elephant ivory and silver.
- Dimensions, centimetres: 23.6 (height) x 38.4 (width) x 23.7 (depth)

The casket is remarkable for its profusion of detail and the finesse of its execution. It is inscribed with sculptures depicting the Abrahamic God, as well as gazelles, eagles, lions, a unicorn and antelopes in a hunting scene. A kufic inscription runs around the top, naming five craftsmen and the object's recipient, ʿAbd al-Malik al-Muẓaffar (975-1008).

In the description of Henry Luttikhuizen,

This precious container is covered with elaborate ornament and includes twenty-one courtly scenes in octagonal lobed medallions. The enthroned caliph is pictured between attendants offering him perfumes and musical entertainment. Feast celebrations, lion and elephant hunts are also represented. These scenes as well as the profusion of vegetal and floral motifs reinforce connotations of a princely paradise.

=== Inscriptions ===
The most prominent inscription on the casket is an Arabic text in foliated Kufic script with bevelled staves running around the edge of the lid. This reads

In the name of God, God be blessed, prosperity, happiness and attainment of expectations from pious works, and respite from the appointed time of death to the hājib Sayf al-Dawla, ‘Abd al-Malik, son of al-Mansūr, may God grant him success. [This is part of it] from that which was ordered to be made under the supervision of the chief page Zuhayr ibn Muhammad al-ʿAmirī, his servant in the year three hundred and ninety-five.

There are a number of much smaller incised inscriptions, giving the names of the craftsmen who made the casket; their names have been interpreted as likely to have been names given to slaves:

- Inside the lid: 'ʿamal faraj maʿa talāmidhihi' ('the work of Faraj, with his apprentices')
- Right-hand side of the lid, on the calf of the right-hand huntsman: 'ʿamal faraj' ('the work of Faraj')
- Front (on the throne-platform in the right-hand cartouche): 'ʿamal misbāh' ('the work of Misbāh')
- Back (on the hunter's shield, in the medallion in the centre): 'ʿamal khayr' ('the work of Kayr') and 'in the name of God, God be blessed, felicity and prosperity'.
- Back (in the medallion on the left-hand side, on the horses' hindquarters): '... md ʿāmir[ī]'
- Right-hand side (on the hindquarters of the left-hand deer in the right-hand medallion): 'ʿamal saʿād' ('the work of Saʿād')
- Left-hand side on the hindquarters of the right-hand deer in the left-hand medallion: 'ʿamal rashīd' ('the work of Rashīd')

== Origin and history ==
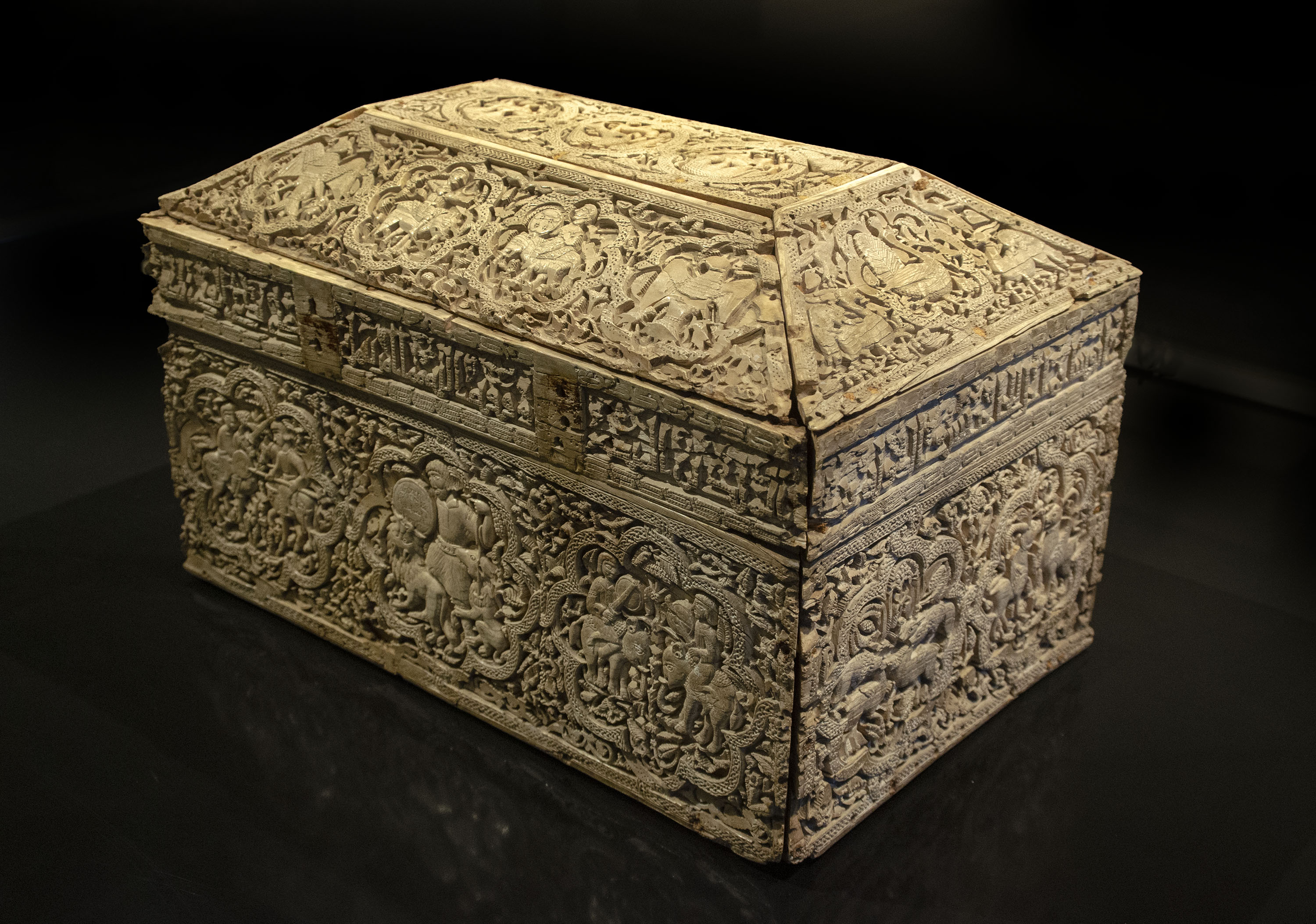
Left-hand and back panels of the casket.

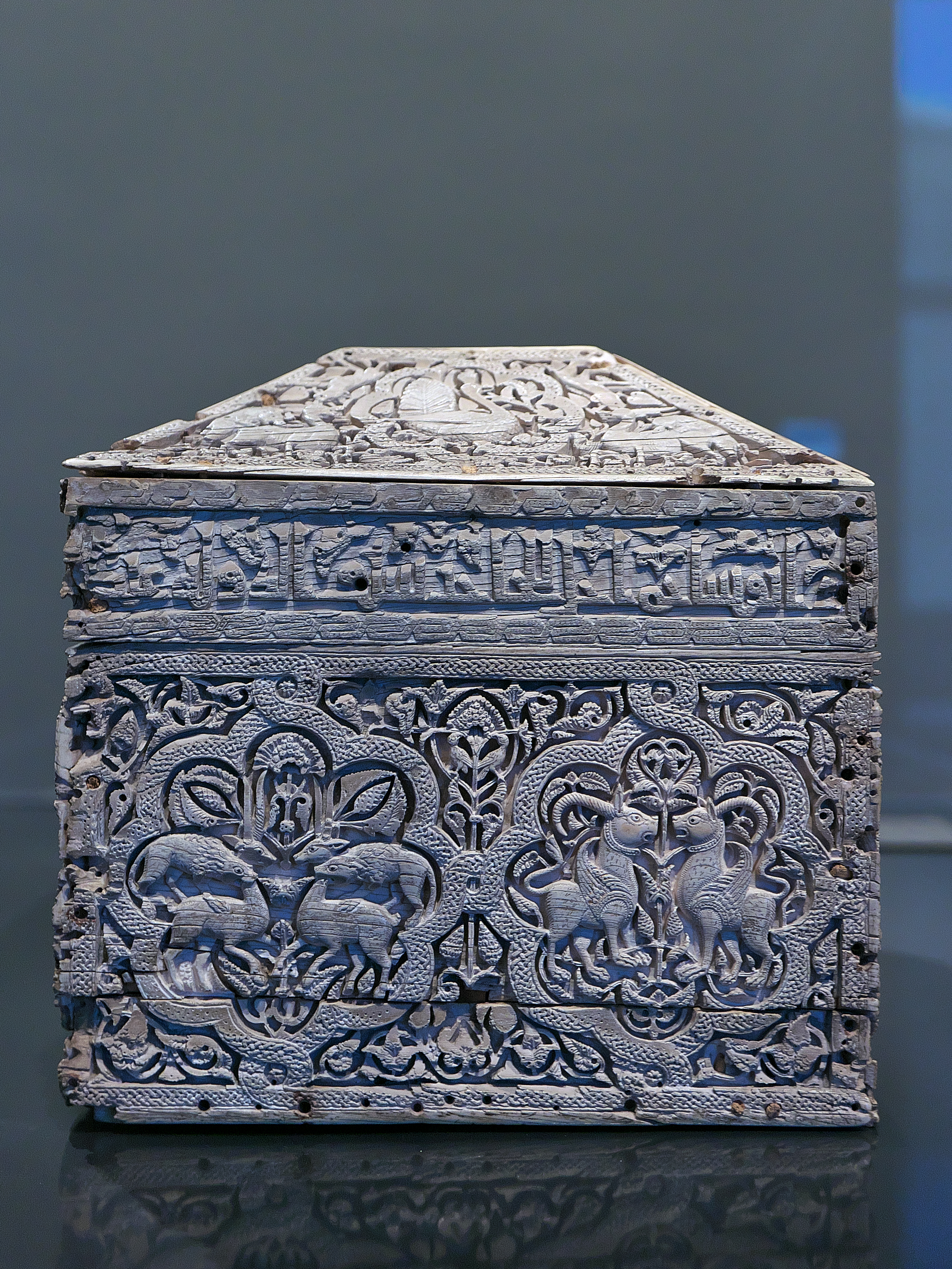
Right-hand panel of the casket.

The casket is the largest example of twenty-nine ivories known to have been manufactured for Muslim patrons between c. 950 and 1050 in the Iberian peninsula, and artistically one of the most impressive. The casket was carved during the Caliphate of Cordoba in the Caliphal workshop of either Madinat al-Zahra, the palace-city built by Abd ar-Rahman III, or Madinat al-Zahira, the rival palace built by Almanzor. The year of production is given as 395 AH (1004/1005 CE). The casket was produced for ʿAbd al-Malik al-Muẓaffar, political and military leader of the caliphate from 1002 to 1008, during the reign of Hisham II. ʿAbd al-Malik is best known for being the son of Almanzor, vizier of Hisham II, but also military leader and strong politician of the caliphate.

At some point, as Christian kingdoms raided or conquered al-Andalus, the casket came into Christian hands and was donated to the Monastery of Leyre (from which it takes its name). There is evidence for booty from such warring arriving in the monstery's possession during the eleventh century, and the casket too is likely to have come north as war-booty. At Leyre the casket was repurposed as a reliquary to hold the remains of Saints Nunilo and Alodia, believed to have been executed as apostates during persecutions of Christians by ʿAbd al-Raḥman II, emir of Cordoba, on the mid-ninth century. Inside the casket, a silk textile fragment was discovered, showing 'a repeating pattern of large-bodied peacocks'; it is thought that this once wrapped the saints' bones.

The casket was later held by the Church of Santa María la Real in Sangüesa and the Treasury of the Cathedral of Pamplona. It was then transferred to the Navarre Museum in Pamplona, where it is on display today.

== See also ==
- Pyxis of al-Mughira
- Pyxis of Zamora
