= Pyxis of Zamora =

Carved ivory casket from the Caliphate of Cordoba

- Bote de Zamora
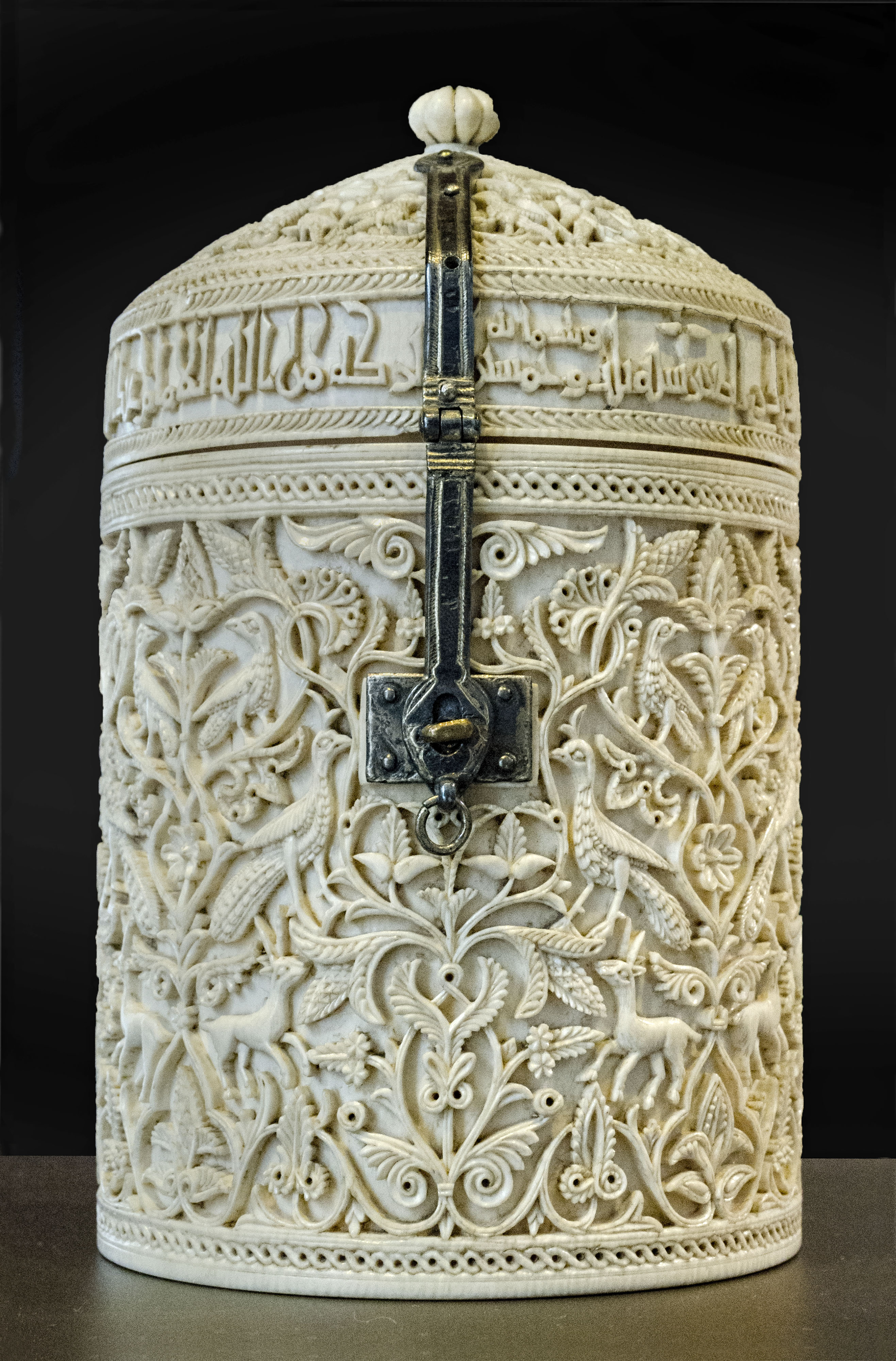
- Click for a three dimensional view.
- Material: Elephant ivory
- Created: Before 964 CE
- Period/culture: Caliphate of Córdoba
- Present location: National Archaeological Museum (Madrid)

The Pyxis of Zamora (Spanish: Bote de Zamora) is a carved casket (Latin: pyxis) made from ivory that dates from the Caliphate of Córdoba (929–1031 CE), and was discovered in the cathedral of Zamora, a city in northwest Spain. It is now in the National Archaeological Museum of Spain in Madrid, Spain.

== Description ==
The cylindrical carved box is around 18 centimetres (7.1 in) in height with a diameter of 10.3 centimetres (4.1 in), and was created using the natural curvature and hollowness of the thickest part of an elephant tusk. Because of the preserved strength in the circular shape of the tusk, this makes it less prone to warping than a rectangular box.

The unbroken cylindrical surface of the ivory tusk from which the pyxis was carved also allows for a unified decorative composition without edges, which includes depictions of spread wings, peacocks, and gazelles. The interlacing effect of this decoration, together with the Arabic inscription on the lid, indicates that the receiver of the pyxis was meant to turn the object around in their hands to fully appreciate the craftsmanship. The decoration also encourages the viewer to open the container, as the expensive exterior mirrors the precious items held inside, such as cosmetics, jewelry, or perfume containers.

The Arabic inscription lining the ivory lid details the patronage and gifting of the pyxis on the occasion of the birth of the Caliph's heir apparent, Prince Abd Al-Rahman (named after his grandfather Abd al-Rahman III), and reads: “The blessing of Allah upon the Imam, the servant of Allah, al-Hakam II al-Mustansir billaḥ, Commander of the Faithful. This is what he ordered to be made for the noble lady, the mother of Abd al-Rahman under the direction of Durri al-Saghir in the year 353 [964 CE]”.

== Historical context ==
The Pyxis of Zamora was commissioned by the Umayyad Caliph of Cordoba Al-Hakam II in 964 CE for Subh, his concubine and the mother of the princes Abd al-Rahman and Hishâm. During this period, the Umayyads in Spain – or al-Andalus as they called the Muslim parts of the Iberian peninsula – were competing with the Abbasid society in Baghdad, as well as attempting to reclaim from Damascus the power that they had previously held during the Umayyad period there.

In Córdoba, the Umayyads commissioned notable architectural developments and luxury goods in order to demonstrate the sophistication of the Cordoban ruling class during the Caliphate of Córdoba. This was celebrated in poetry and visual art, including textiles and ivory carvings such as the Pyxis of Zamora, with the iconography of the carvings on pyxises created during this period reinforcing the ideas of Umayyad political superiority over the Abbasids. The Pyxis of Zamora, created in the flourishing intellectual city center of Córdoba during the peak of Hispano-Umayyad art, was a demonstration of the refinement of the Córdoba Caliphate.

== Quality and expense ==
Ivory carving was a widespread practice in the Mediterranean world from before the time of the Roman empire. However, there is no evidence of ivory box or pyxis carvings in Spain before the Umayyads took control of the peninsula in the 8th century CE, bringing the tradition with them to Spain.

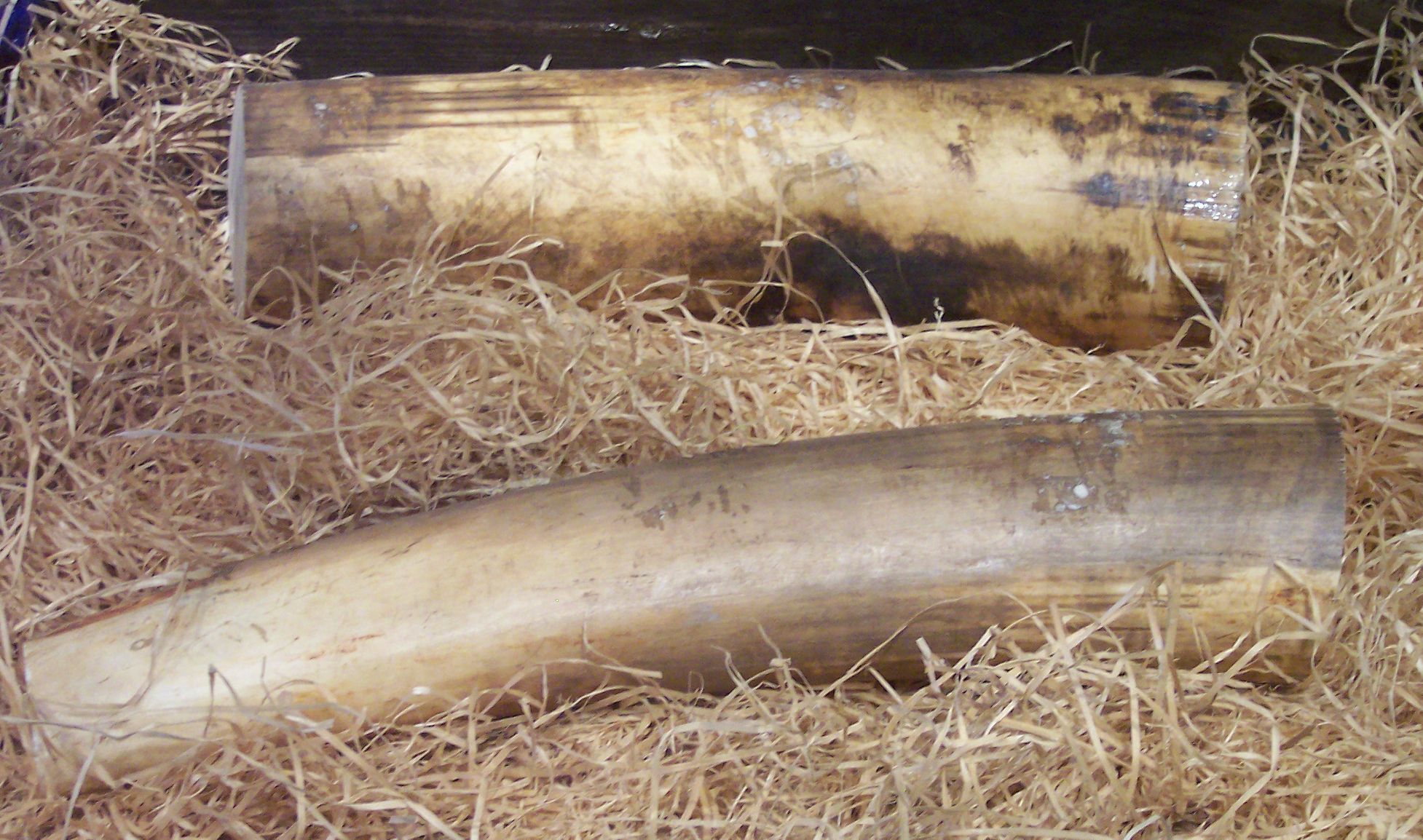
Elephant Ivory

Among Islamic, Christian, and Roman carvings, a sign of good workmanship was a lack of tool marks. The Pyxis of Zamora displays this quality of work throughout the deep-relief interlacing pattern, with such craftsmanship linked to the palatine ivory workshops of Madinat al-Zahra. These carving techniques are also seen in other pyxises created in the same period, such as the Pyxis of al-Mughira.

Carving ivory pyxises was also very expensive due to the distance between sub-Saharan Africa and India – where elephant tusk was procured – and the Mediterranean – where it was carved. Further, the carving of small and intricate objects such as pyxises took precision and time which also added to the overall price, making them accessible only to the royal class.

== Symbolism of the decorations ==
=== The winged motif ===
The Pyxis of Zamora features many depictions of spread wings within its arabesque decoration. The winged motif gained popularity during its use in Sasanian culture, with extended wings symbolizing power and religion and hence often seen on the crowns of Sasanian kings and on Sasanian seals. This Sasanian trend later influenced the royal decorative arts of the Umayyad period, resulting in the repeated use of the winged motif on luxury goods.

=== The peacock ===
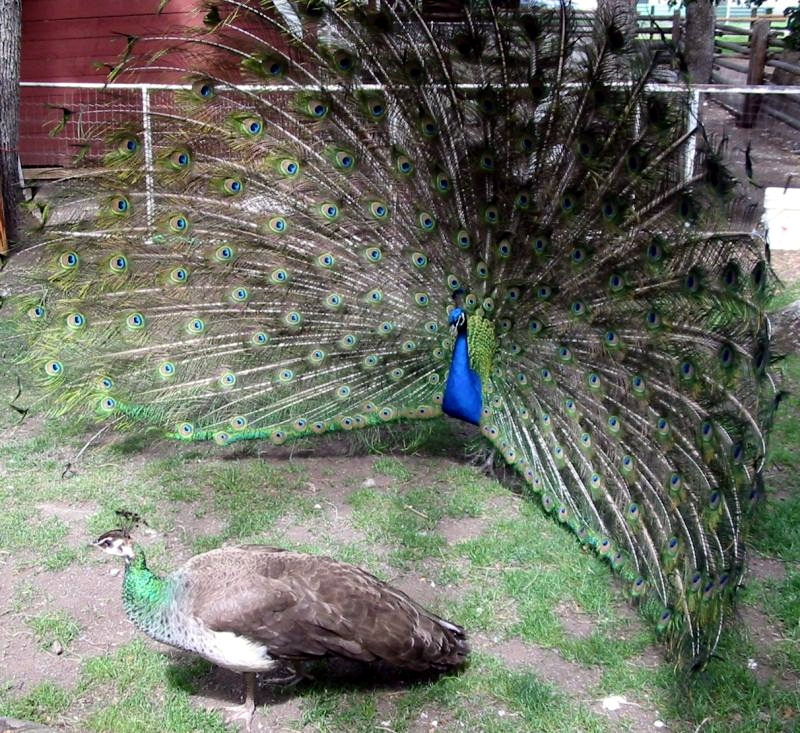
Peacock

The image of a peacock is repeated four times in the central section of the Pyxis of Zamora. In the context of medieval Islam, peacocks were viewed as having apotropaic (anti-evil) powers, resulting in varying Islamic beliefs about the bird. Some Islamic interpreters believed the peacock mated asexually, thus associating the bird with purity, while Arabic naturalists believed peacocks could detect poison, leading to the common medicinal use of peacock feathers. Popular legends told of the bird's ability to kill snakes, a religious allusion to the peacock's ability to avert the evil influences of the devil, giving the bird a connection to the Islamic conception of Paradise. The peacock continued to be an important image in the Islamic world, and feathers or images of peacocks were often used in a royal context in imitation of Persian traditions.

=== The gazelle ===
Several images of a gazelle surround the peacocks depicted on the Pyxis of Zamora. In pre-Islamic Arabic poetry the gazelle was often depicted as having magical qualities, with their slender bodies and wide eyes purportedly alluding to those of women. Later Umayyads continued to associate gazelles with femininity and elegance. Viewed as seductive and swift prey, they were often celebrated by hunters.

== See also ==
- Pyxis of al-Mughira
- Leyre Casket
