= ManBeef.com =

Hoax website

Man Beef
- Website type: Former hoax website
- Owner: Chris Ellerby/Joseph Mallett
- Creator: Chris Ellerby/Joseph Mallett
- Website: ManBeef.com
- Commercial: No
- Registration: None needed
- Launched: January 4, 2001
- Current status: Inactive

ManBeef.com was an elaborate hoax site beginning in January 2001, purporting to sell human meat, and offering tips and recipes on preparing meals. Colorful pictures and illustrations adorned the site to further the appearance of legitimacy. Like Bonsai Kitten, many individuals fell for the hoax and were disgusted. News of the site spread primarily by means of e-mail forwarding, often in the form of petitions calling to stop the immorality.

To avoid exposing the hoax, ManBeef claimed they did not allow customers to purchase meat products from the site itself. "We do this, because we prefer to deal with our customers on a more personal basis," the disclaimer stated in part. The only products actually available to purchase were souvenir merchandise such as mousepads, mugs and t-shirts.

== Traffic ==
At its peak, the site received about 500,000 hits daily. It was causing so much controversy that the U.S. Food and Drug Administration (FDA) launched an investigation, and found no wrongdoing because there was no evidence of human meat actually being sold. In June 2001, the creators of the site, Chris Ellerby and Joseph Mallett, who used the combined pseudonym "Joseph Christopherson", declared that the site was indeed a hoax, and in July, issued a statement to The Columbian stating the purpose of the site was to "outrage the more sensitive viewers".

== Demise ==
In 2005, the registration for the ManBeef.com domain name expired and was quickly taken by a pornography-themed cybersquatter. As of 18 June 2014, the website was a parked domain for sale at with an asking price in excess of $10,000.

== Copycat sites ==
KittyBeef.com and PuppyBeef.com (now defunct) were similar hoax sites that claimed to sell cat and dog meat. They used the ManBeef site as a template, though cat meat and dog meat are in fact readily consumed in parts of the world.

== See also ==
- Soylent Green
