= Puzzle ball =

Puzzle ball, puzzle sphere, or puzzle globe may refer to:

- Chinese puzzle balls, ivory folk art constructions
- Spherical jigsaw puzzles
  - the Wikipedia logo, a spherical jigsaw puzzle image
