= Impossible bottle =

Bottle with an item larger than the neck

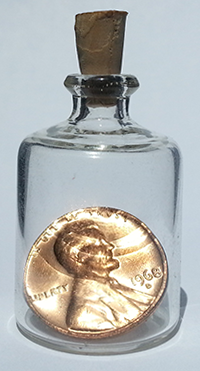
A US penny in a small bottle, achieved by forming molten glass around the coin

An impossible bottle is a bottle containing an object that appears too large to fit through the bottle's mouth.

The ship model in a bottle is a traditional type of impossible bottle. Other common objects include fruits, matchboxes, decks of cards, tennis balls, racketballs, Rubik's Cubes, padlocks, knots, and scissors. These may be placed inside the bottle using various mechanisms, including constructing an object inside the bottle from smaller parts, using a small object that expands or grows inside the bottle, or molding the glass around the object.

== Ship in a bottle ==
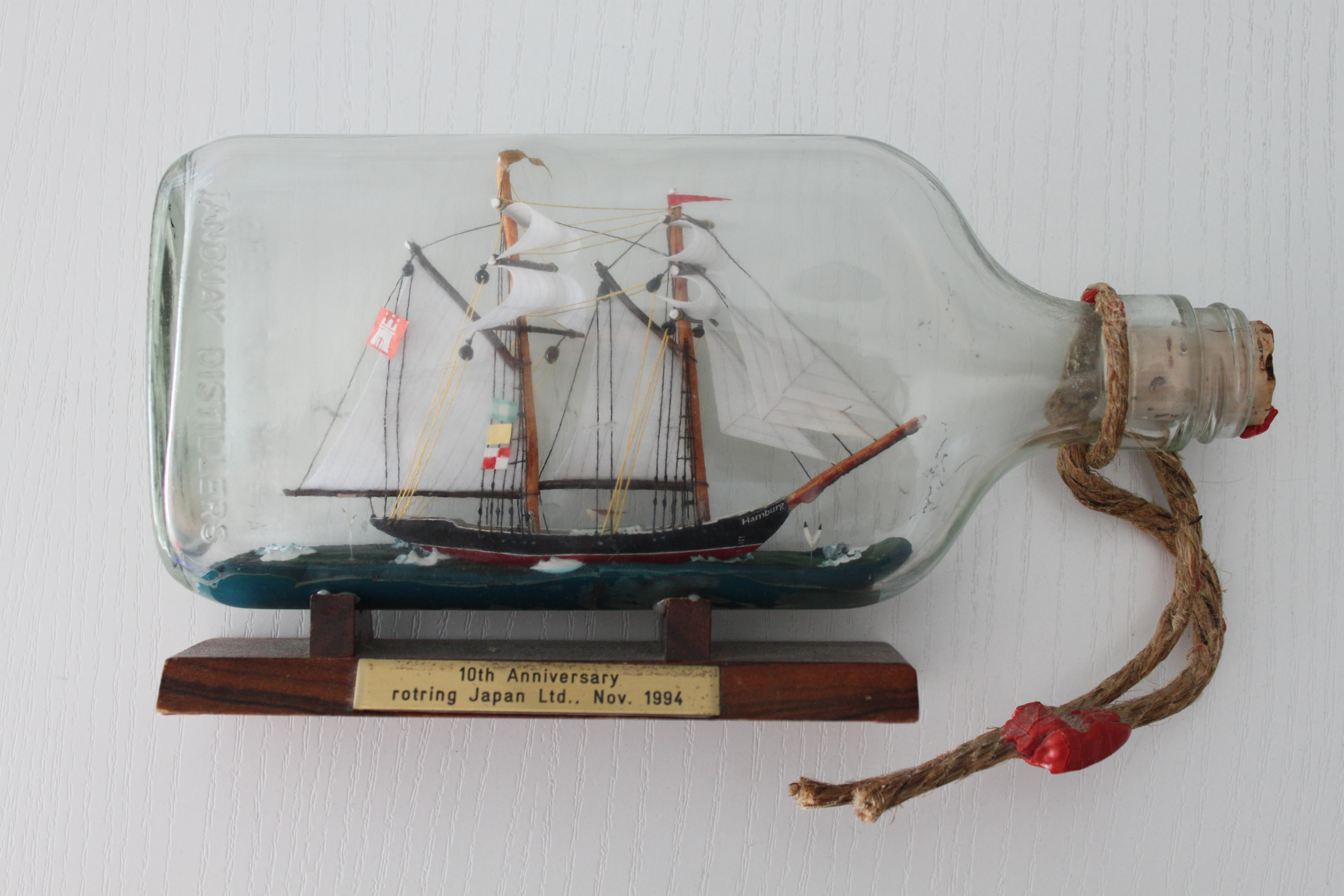
Ship in a bottle

Ships in a bottle are made by rigging the masts of the ship and raising it up when the ship is inside the bottle. Masts, spars, and sails are built separately and then attached to the hull of the ship with strings and hinges so the masts can lie flat against the deck. The ship is then placed inside the bottle and the masts are pulled up using the strings attached to the masts. The hull of the ship must still be able to fit through the opening.

The oldest surviving ships in a bottle were crafted by Giovanni Biondo at the end of the eighteenth century; two, at least, reproduce Venetian ships of the line. These are quite large and expensive models: the bottles (intended to be displayed upside down, with the neck resting on a small pedestal) measure about 45 cm. The oldest (1784) is in a museum in Lübeck; another (1786) is held by a private collector; the third (1792), that apparently reproduces the heavy frigate PN Fama, is in the Navy Museum in Lisbon. Another old model (1795), from an unknown builder, is kept in a museum in Rotterdam.

Ships in bottles became more popular as folk art in the second half of the nineteenth century, after the introduction of cheap, mass-produced bottles made with clear glass.

A significant collection of ships in bottles is the Dashwood-Howard collection held by the Merseyside Maritime Museum.

== God-in-a-bottle ==
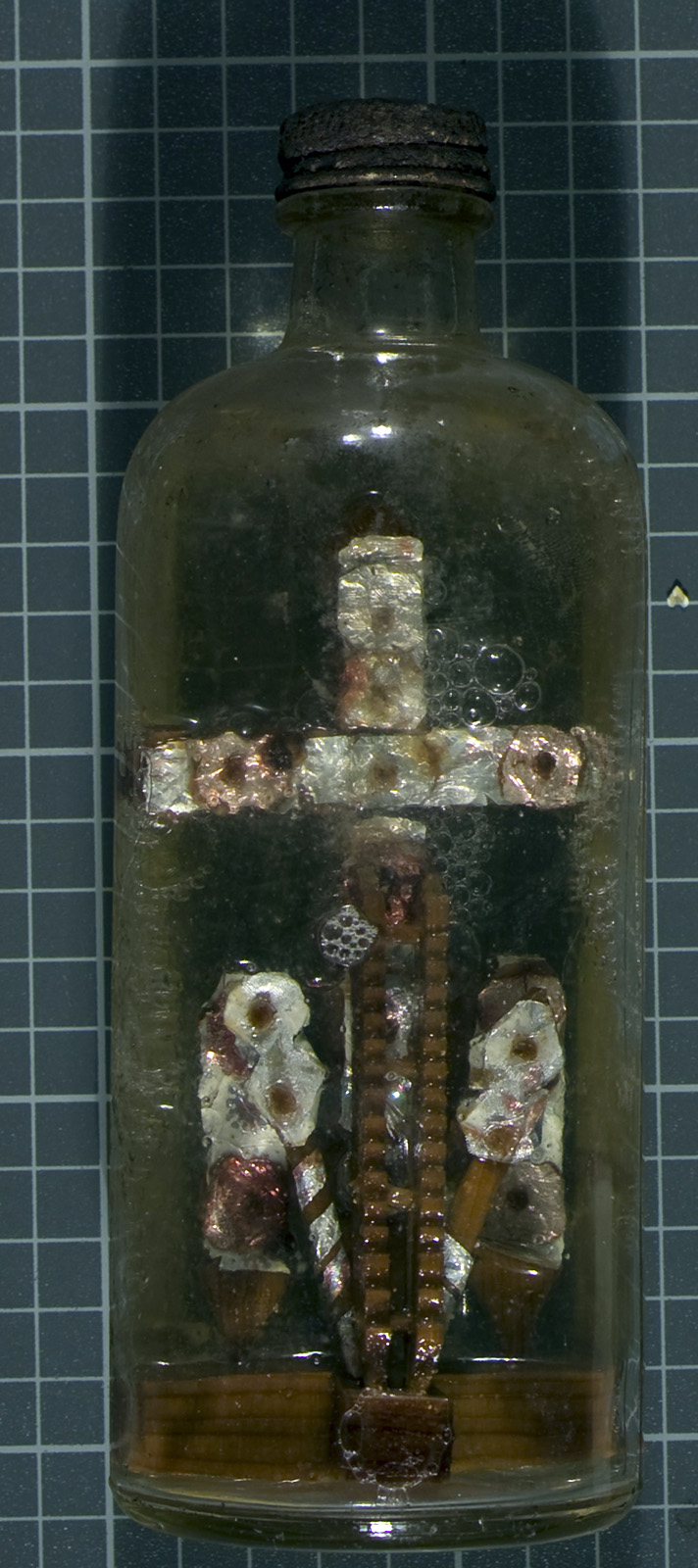
God-in-a-bottle made by an Irish WWI soldier in a German POW camp

God-in-a-bottle, or God-in-the-Bottle, is a symbolisation of the crucifixion of Jesus through the placing in a bottle of carved wooden items, including a cross and often others such as a ladder and spear [of Longinus]. The crossbeam of the cross is attached to the vertical beam after both are in the bottle. The bottles were often filled with liquid, latterly sometimes with particles akin to a snow globe. Such bottles were used in 19th-century Irish Catholicism as devotional objects or as talismans akin to witch bottles. They were found elsewhere in Catholic Europe, and are related to older "Passion Bottles", made by glassblowers in their spare time, where a large variety of small glass symbols of the Passion of Jesus were inserted into a bottle.

The making of Gods-in-bottles was exported through Irish diaspora, notably to mining communities in Northern England, where scenes with mining tools sometimes replaced the crucifixion. Examples are in the collections of the National Museum of Ireland – Country Life the Irish Agricultural Museum, Enniscorthy Castle museum, and the Beamish Museum in County Durham. Later makers were often Irish Travellers, whose craftworks often recycle discarded objects. Richard Power's 1964 novel The Land of Youth, set in a fictional version of the Aran Islands, mentions an outcast who uses driftwood for what is "known to generations of children as God-in-a-bottle." Although the Offaly Independent says that in the 1970s "almost every pub in Tullamore" displayed a bottle, by the 21st century they were largely unknown in Ireland. A 2023 episode of Nationwide reported on two men in the Irish midlands still practising the tradition.

== Small objects that expand naturally ==
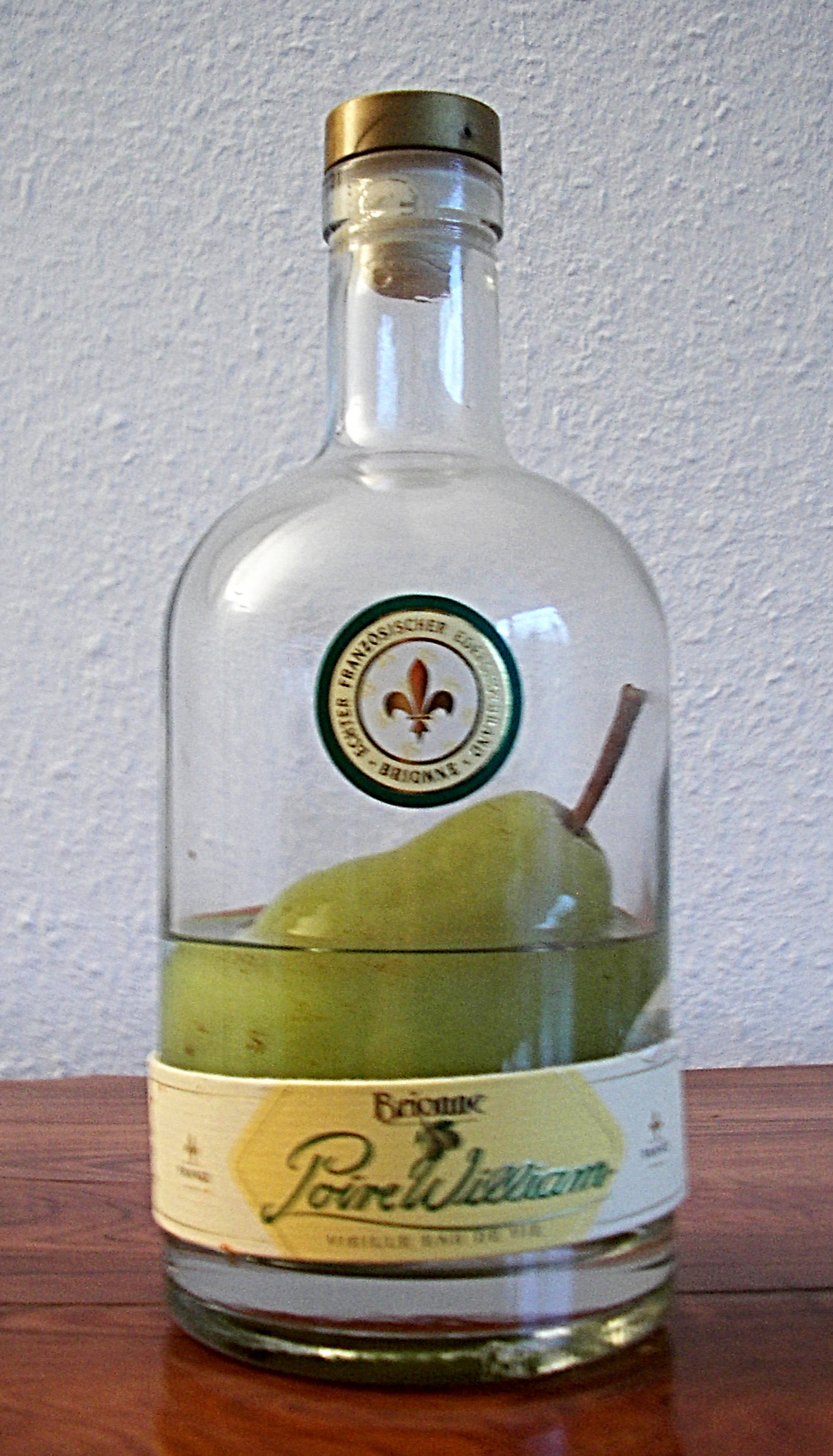
A prisonnière Poire Williams

One variation of the impossible bottle takes advantage of pine cones opening as they dry out. In constructing the display, a closed, green cone of suitable size is inserted into a narrow-mouthed bottle and then allowed to dry inside the bottle.

Fruits and vegetables inside bottles are grown by placing a bottle around the blossom or young fruit and securing it to the plant. The fruit then grows to full size inside the bottle. This technique is used to put pears into bottles of pear brandy (most famously the French eau de vie Poire Williams).

== See also ==
- Bonsai Kitten
- Chinese puzzle ball
