= BuyTigers.com =

Hoax site which claims to sell tigers

- Website type: Satirical website
- Owner: Aldo Tripiciano
- Creator: Aldo Tripiciano
- Website: www.buytigers.com
- Commercial: No
- Registration: None needed
- Launched: March 5, 2006; 20 years ago

BuyTigers.com is a satirical website that claims to sell tigers online and ship them worldwide. After complaints by People for the Ethical Treatment of Animals (PETA), the author revealed the site to be a hoax.

== History ==
BuyTigers.com was designed by Aldo Tripiciano, an Italian webmaster and search engine optimization (SEO) professional. On March 5, 2006, the first version of the BuyTigers.com site was published by Tripiciano on a private web server. Promoted by Tripiciano, the site grew in popularity and attracted controversy from concerned animal rights activists. In September 2008, PETA petitioned the Indian Government to launch an investigation into the site. and Italian Guardia di Finanza. Following the investigation, Tripiciano posted a public disclaimer that revealed the site as a hoax. After the 2011 Ohio exotic animal release, the site received further media attention.

== Site ==
BuyTigers.com consists of a single-page website with pictures of young tigers, presented as if real examples of animals offered for sale. The site claims that the tigers, despite being strong and dangerous predators, are trained to be loving, loyal and "totally harmless" pets. The website also claims to have been shipping tigers worldwide since 1984. A "tiger package", offered for $13,400, includes a five-month-old female tiger, an ivory collar, tiger toys, and a training guide.

The site was selected by the radio network Heart as one of the best Internet hoaxes of all time.

== See also ==
- Bonsai Kitten
- List of satirical news websites
