= Square watermelon =

Watermelon grown in the shape of a cube

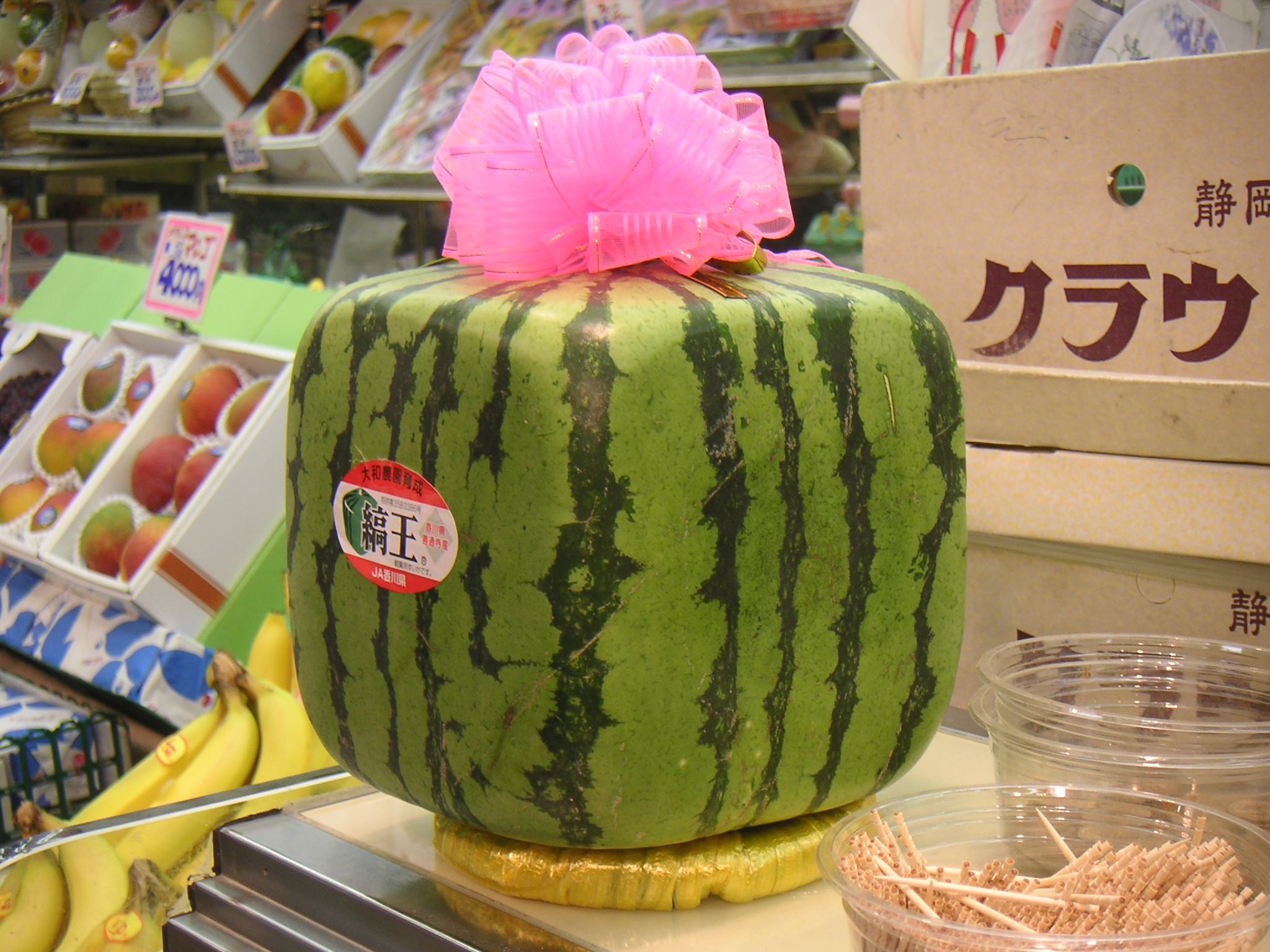
Square watermelon from Japan

Square or cube watermelons are watermelons grown into the shape of a cube. Cube watermelons are commonly sold in Japan, where they are essentially ornamental and are often very expensive, with prices as high as US$200.

== Purpose and uses ==
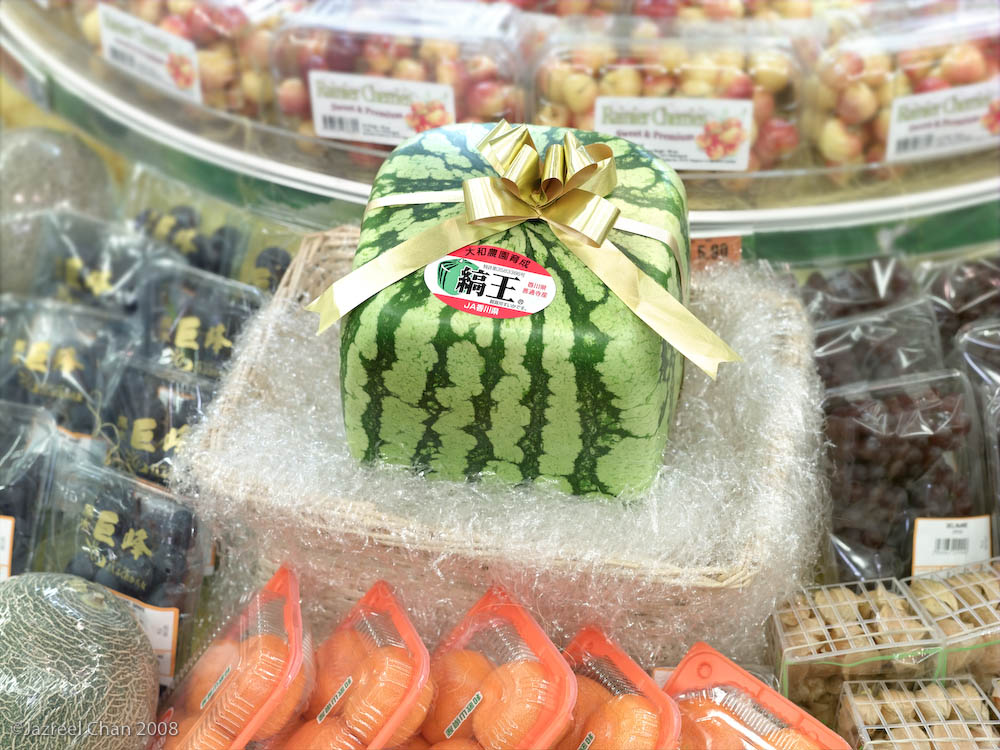
Cubic Japanese watermelon in market

Cube watermelons were intended to fit more compactly in fridges and their shape makes them easier to cut as they do not roll. They were invented by graphic designer Tomoyuki Ono in 1978. He presented the watermelons in a gallery in Ginza, Tokyo. He also applied for and received a patent in the United States.

The melons are grown in boxes and take the shape of the container, and they tend to appeal to wealthy or fashionable consumers. In 2001, square watermelons sold for ¥10,000 in Japan (about US$83), two to three times the price of regular watermelons in Japanese stores. In Canada in 2014, some sold for $200.

Although cube melons were originally created with practicality in mind, the cost is prohibitive. The cube shape of the watermelon can only be achieved at the expense of its contents. To retain the proper shape, cube melons must be harvested before they are ripe, rendering them inedible.

Since the advent of the cube watermelon, other watermelon shapes have been introduced, such as hearts and pyramids. They are also available in other countries now, such as in Germany.

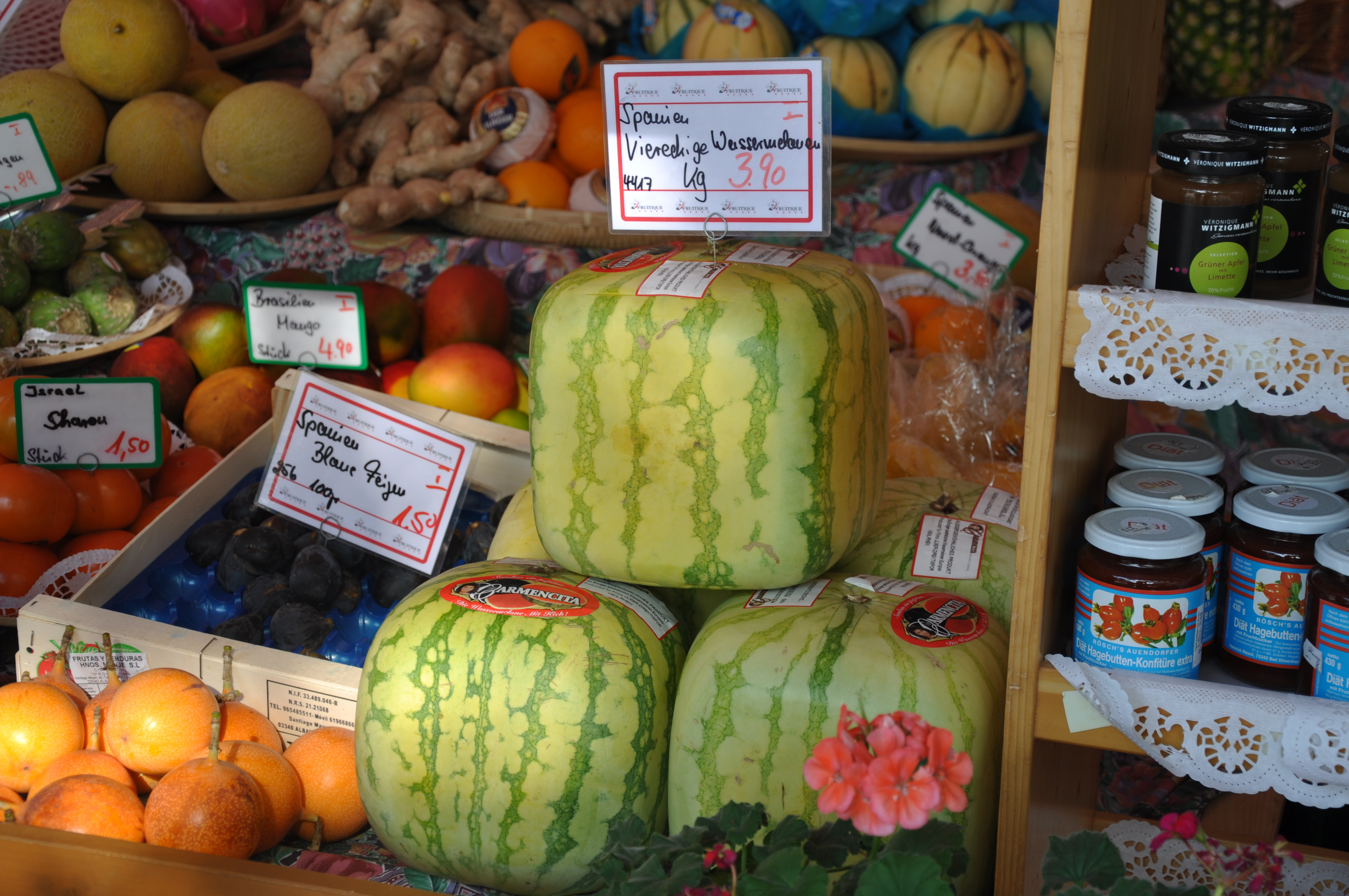
Cubic watermelon in market, Munich, Germany

== See also ==
- Bonsai kitten, an urban legend surrounding cats allegedly "grown" this way
- Unusually shaped fruits and vegetables
