= Peter pepper =

Heirloom chili pepper

Peter red pepper
- Mature Peter red chili next to a dried pod
- Species: Capsicum annuum var. annuum
- Heat: Hot
- Scoville scale: 10,000-23,000 SHU

The peter pepper, Capsicum annuum var. annuum, is an heirloom chili pepper that is best known for its distinctive shape. It is a type of Capsicum annuum, though it is not officially recognized as a cultivar of the species. It occurs in red and yellow varieties. The pepper is considered very rare and its origin is unknown.

The pepper is most commonly grown in East Texas, Louisiana, and in parts of Mexico. It was first popularized in the United States by Texas journalist, historian, and chili enthusiast Frank X. Tolbert in his Dallas Morning News column about obscure local history, although he saw the pepper only once in his life. It has since been studied by horticulture experts at the University of Texas at Austin and Louisiana State University. Though it is rare, its seeds are available from some private suppliers. It is adaptable to a variety of growing conditions. The seeds have also been exported to Asian countries, including South Korea.

The pepper has often been noted for its phallic appearance when fully grown. The red variety has been described as a "miniature replica of the uncircumcised male organ". The pod of the pepper is wrinkled and has a round tip with a cleft. It is approximately 3 to 4 inches long, and 1 to 1.5 inches wide when fully mature. The pod of the pepper has also been noted for its pungency.

The pepper has a Scoville scale rating of 10,000-23,000 SHU depending on cultivation and preparation, making it more spicy than the jalapeño. The peter pepper has both ornamental and culinary use. Common uses include pickling, salsa, and chili pepper. It can be used like jalapeño or serrano peppers.

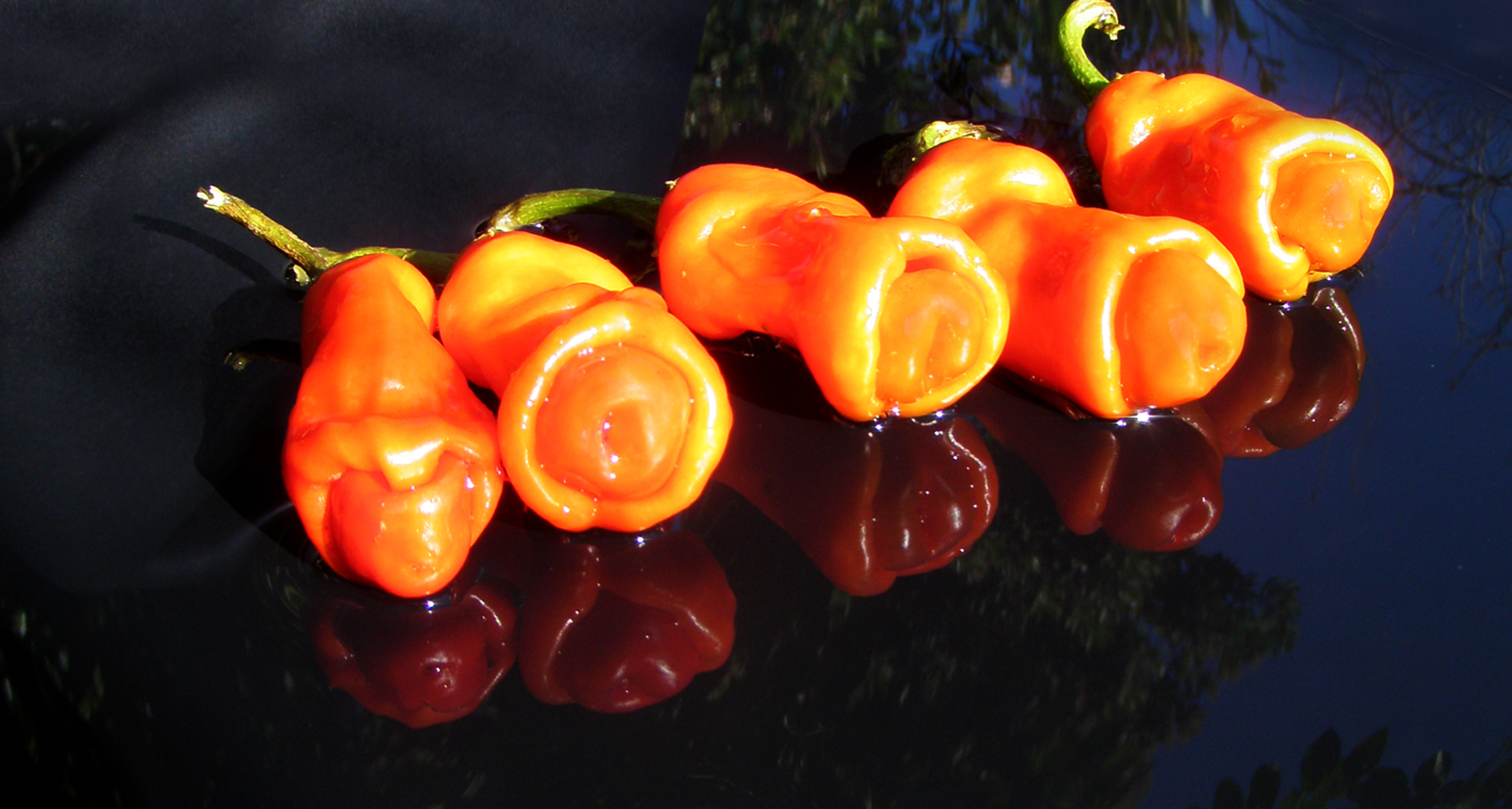
Peter peppers

== Sexually suggestive appearance ==
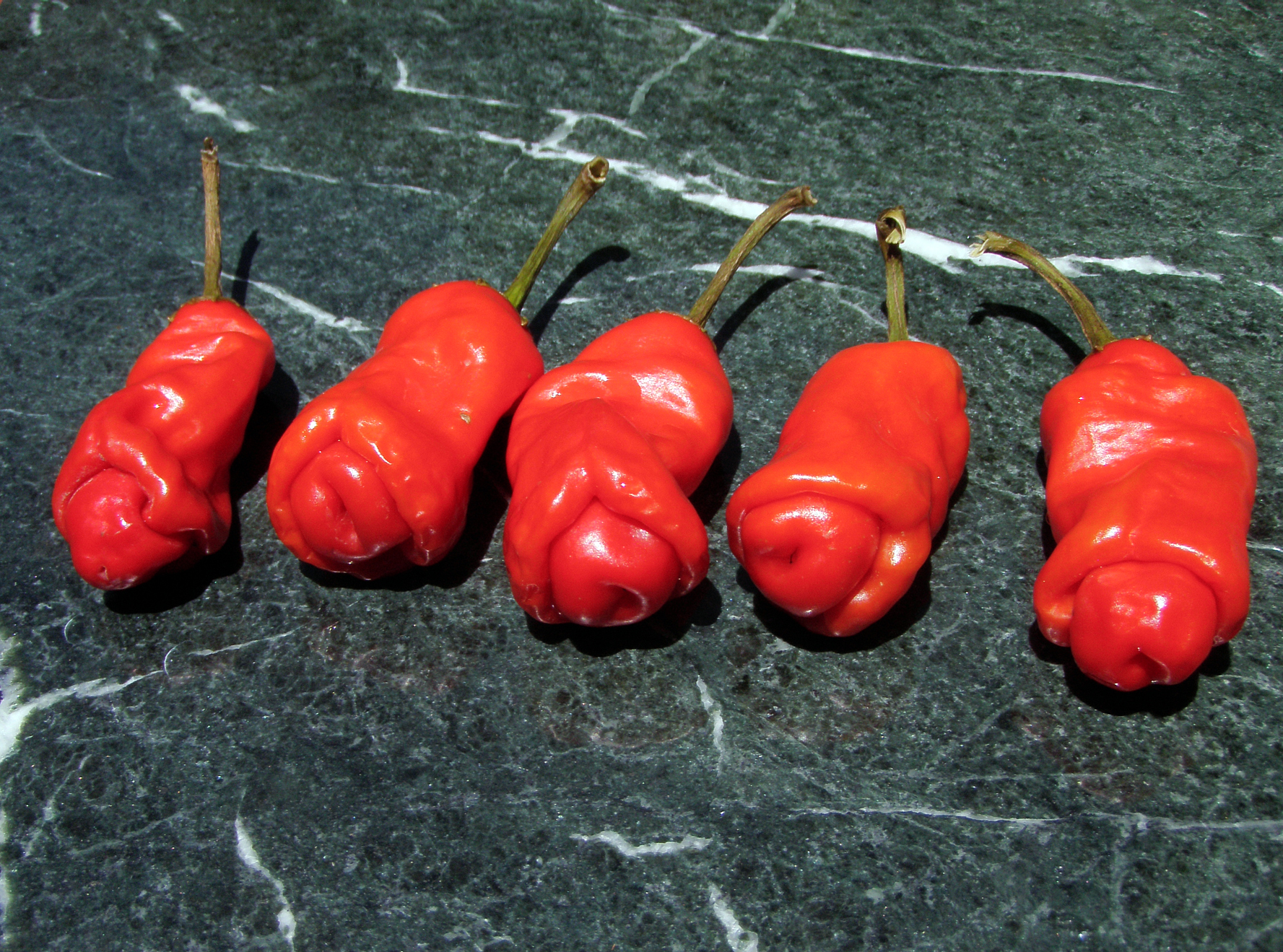
Peter peppers

The unusual appearance of the peter pepper inspires descriptive names such as "penis pepper" and "Chilly Willy/Willy Chilly." According to the book Peppers: the domesticated Capsicums, the peppers naturally contort into "a miniature replica of the uncircumcised male organ." The uniquely-shaped chilis were named "the most pornographic pepper" by Organic Gardening Magazine. The peter pepper is a product of selective breeding.

In the book Temptations: Igniting the Pleasure and Power of Aphrodisiacs, the pepper is called a "very hot Latin lover" who "likes to brag about his size and heat."

== Cultivation and use ==
In Backwoods Home Magazine, Alice Brantley Yeager describes the process of growing peter peppers: "The best growing conditions involve a sunny spot in the garden, moderately rich soil and the same amount of water you’d give any other pepper plant when drought threatens." It is recommended to use a seed starter for a better result, but if a seed starter is not available, the seeds could be planted "in a plastic or clay pot in a sunny window".

== See also ==
- Unusually shaped fruits and vegetables
