= Unusually shaped fruits and vegetables =

Plant not in line with its normal body plan

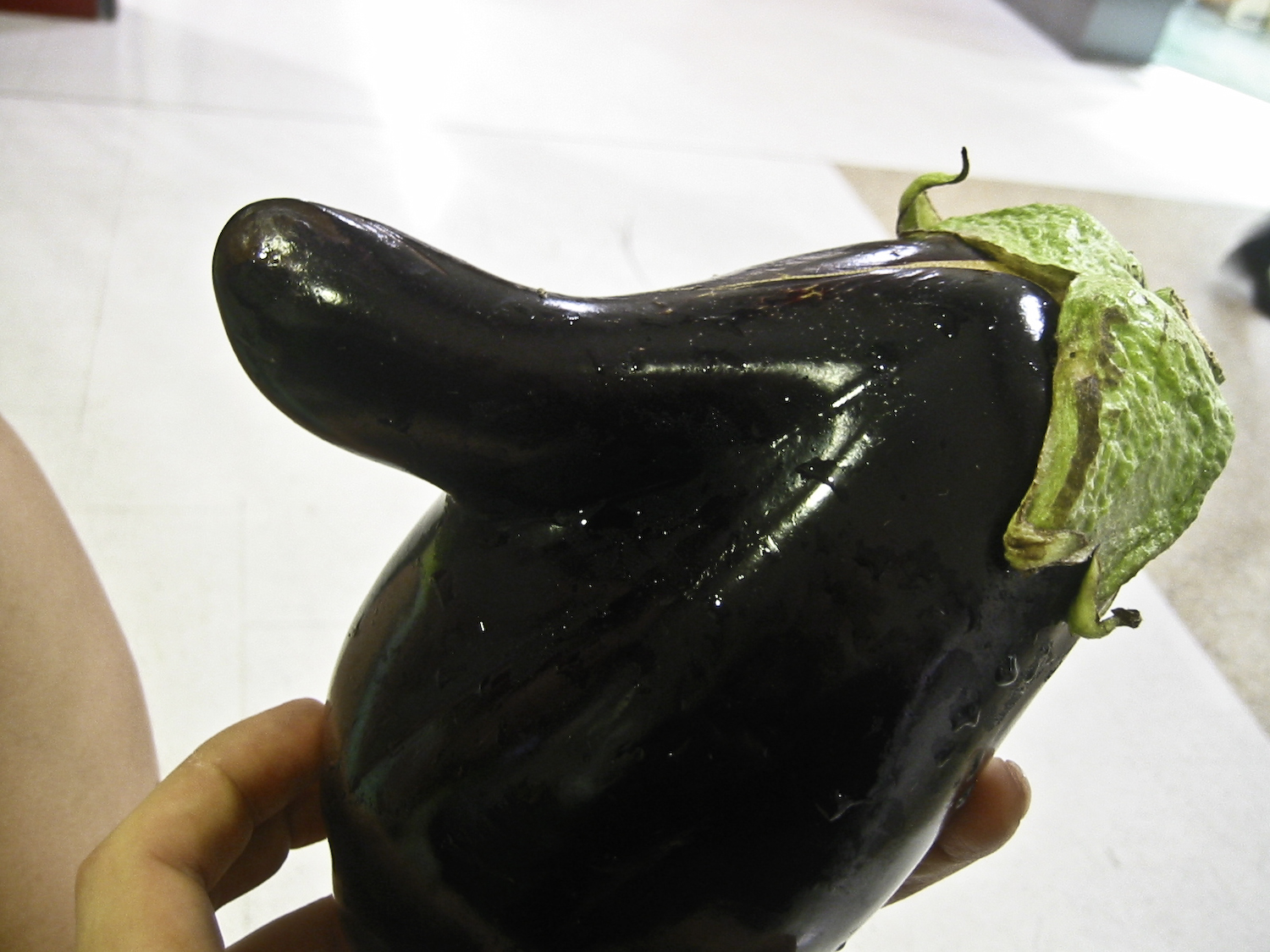
An unusually-shaped eggplant which resembles a cartoonish head with hair and a nose

Unusually shaped fruits and vegetables have shapes that are not in line with their normal body plans. While some examples are just oddly shaped, others are heralded for their amusing appearance, often because they resemble a body part such as the buttocks or genitalia. Pareidolia, the tendency to mistakenly see a face in an object or visual, can be common in vegetables, with some people reporting the appearance of religious imagery.

== Causes ==
Vegetables usually grow into an unusual shape due to environmental conditions. Damage to one part of the vegetable can cause the growth to slow in that area while the rest grows at the normal rate. When a root vegetable is growing and the tip is damaged, it can sometimes split, forming multiple roots attached at one point. If a plant is in the primordium (embryonic development) stage, damage to the growing vegetable can cause more extreme mutations.

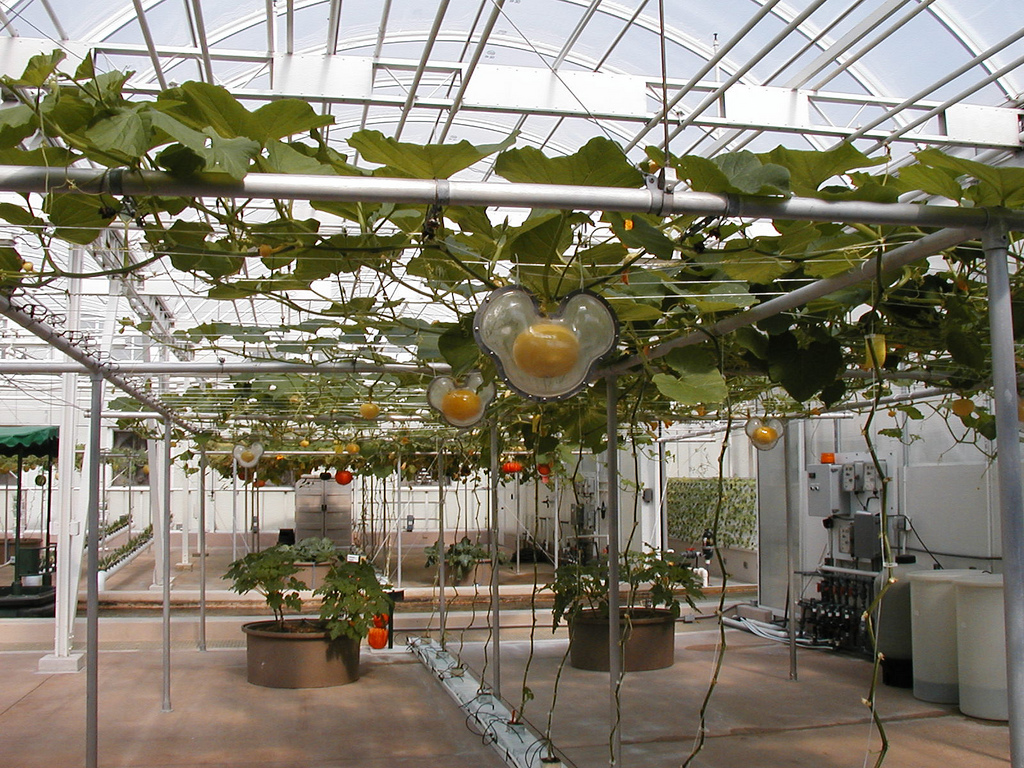
Pumpkins being grown into Mickey Mouse head shapes at The Land pavilion at Epcot in Florida.

The unusual shape can also be forced upon the vegetable. In Japan, farmers of the Zentsuji region found a way to grow square watermelons by growing the fruits in glass boxes and letting them naturally assume the shape of the receptacle. The square-shaped watermelon was intended to make the melons easier to stack and store, but because the melons must be picked before they are ripe they are inedible; the cubic watermelons are also often more than double the price of normal watermelons. Using similar techniques, growers have also created more complex shapes of watermelon, including dice, pyramids, and faces.

Root vegetables, especially those such as carrots and parsnips, will naturally grow around or avoid obstacles in the soil such as small stones and other foreign objects to prevent damage to the developing root, resulting in a wide variety of different shapes.

== Legislation ==
In the European Union, attempts to introduce legislation prohibiting the sale of misshapen fruit and vegetables were defeated. The proposed "uniform standardisation parameters" would have applied to straight bananas and curved cucumbers, as well as to more extreme cases such as carrots with multiple "legs", or fused fruit. The main concern for opponents of the proposed legislation was the ethical question of the wastage it would have generated if growers were forced to discard up to 20% of their crop, produce that was nutritionally identical to more regularly shaped specimens.

== Changing consumer behaviour ==
As of 2015, around 40% of commercially-grown fruits and vegetables are not eaten as they do not meet retailers' cosmetic standards. In France, the Fruits et légumes moches campaign aims to encourage the purchase of more unusually shaped vegetables and fruits to combat food waste.

A similar campaign, "Frutta Brutta", was started in Milan, Italy. Multiple startups in the US have also been formed to sell and repurpose surplus and oddly shaped produce.

== Competitions ==
It is common in some countries to celebrate the diversity of vegetable shapes, with particularly unusual items being entered into competitions. Many of these are judged by the ugliness of the vegetable. Some organisations run contests in which gardeners enter the largest vegetables that they have grown.

== In popular culture ==
The popular BBC television program That's Life! mixed investigative journalism with more lighthearted sections, which included items on unusually shaped vegetables.

The BBC comedy television program Blackadder contains several jokes relating to the character Baldrick and his obsession with odd-shaped turnips. The most notable example occurs in the episode "Beer", in which Baldrick discovers a turnip shaped like a "thingy," giving rise to several jokes throughout the episode.

== Gallery ==
"Twin" tomatoes

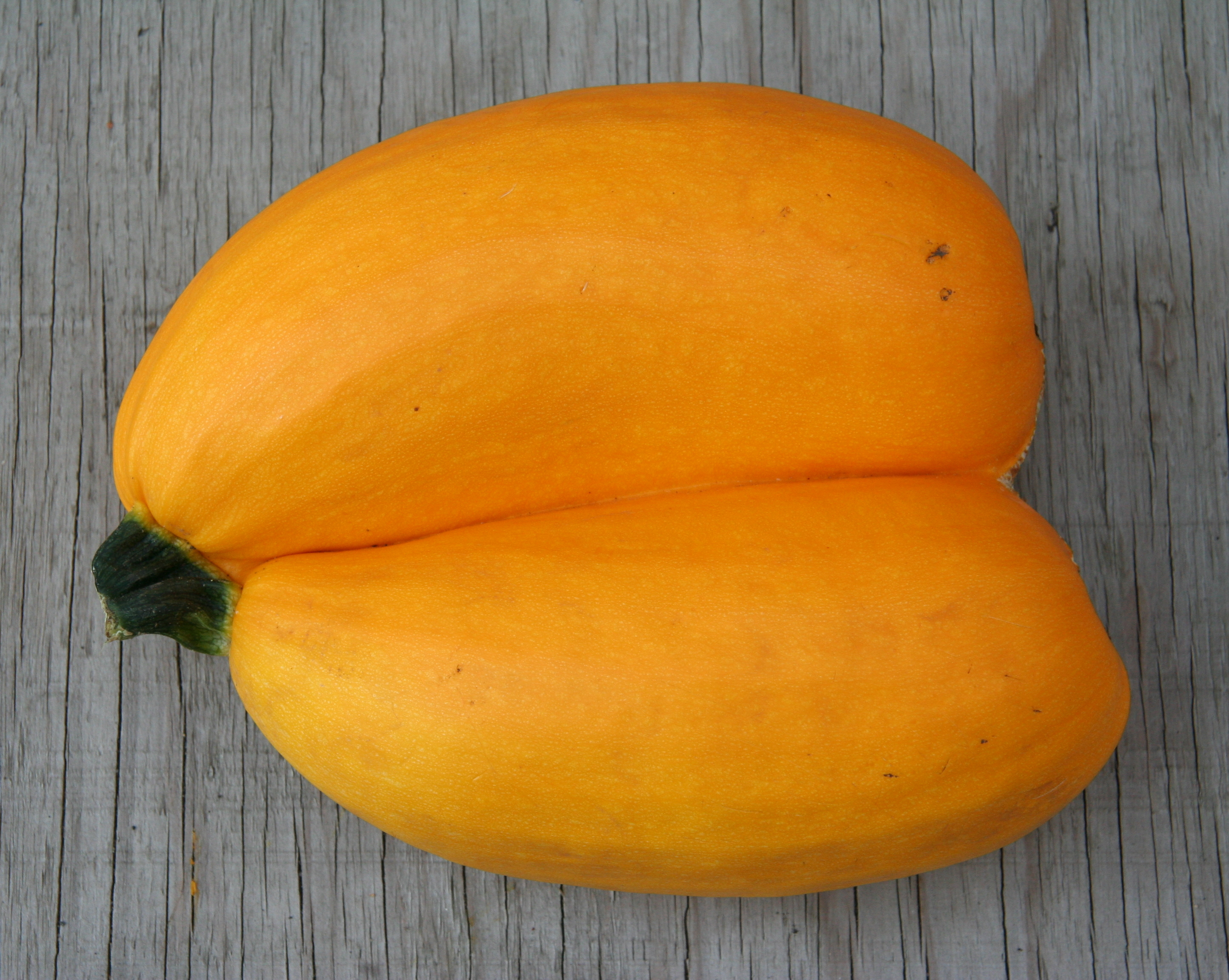
"Twin" courgette/zucchini

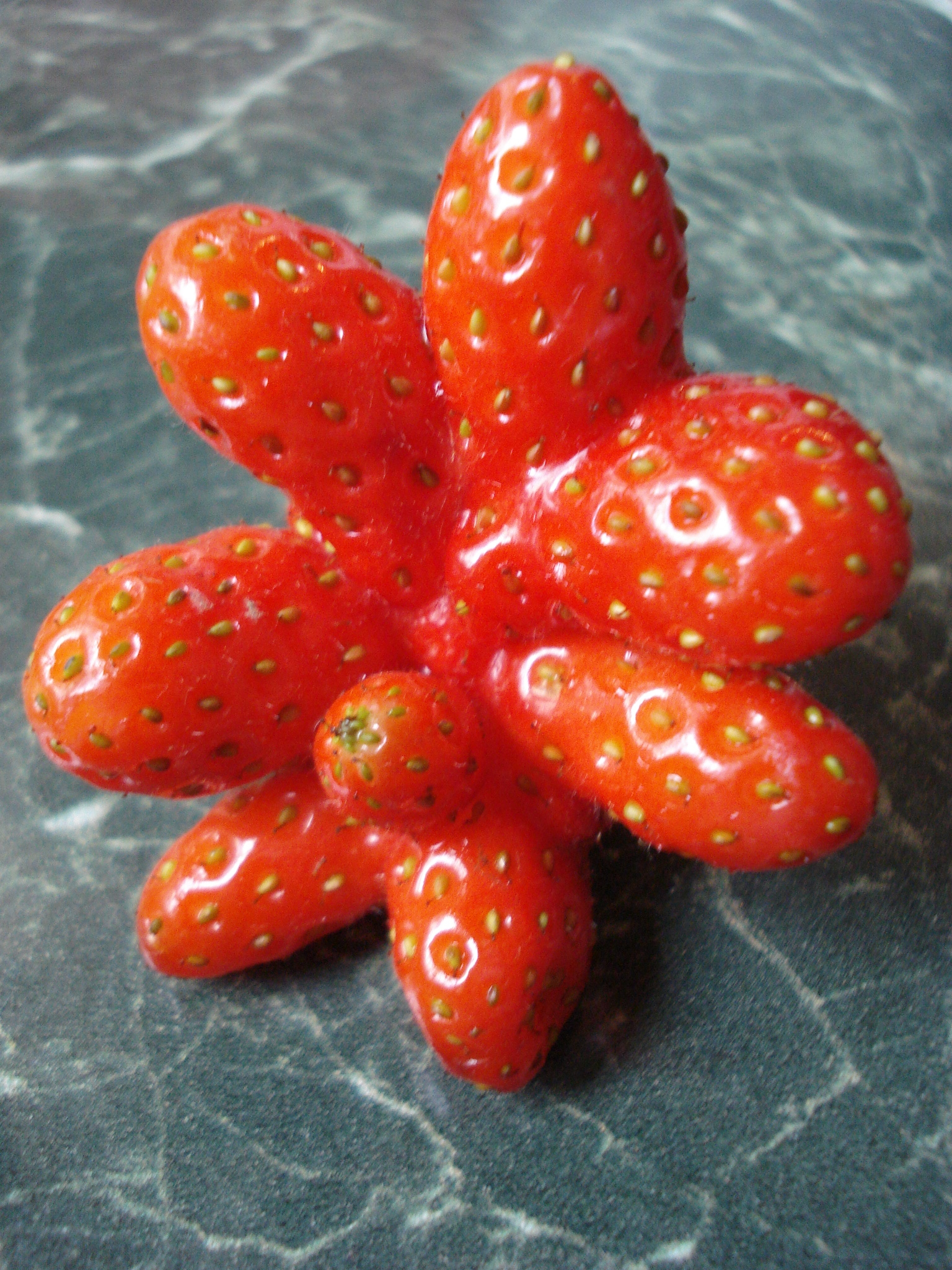
A strawberry "man"

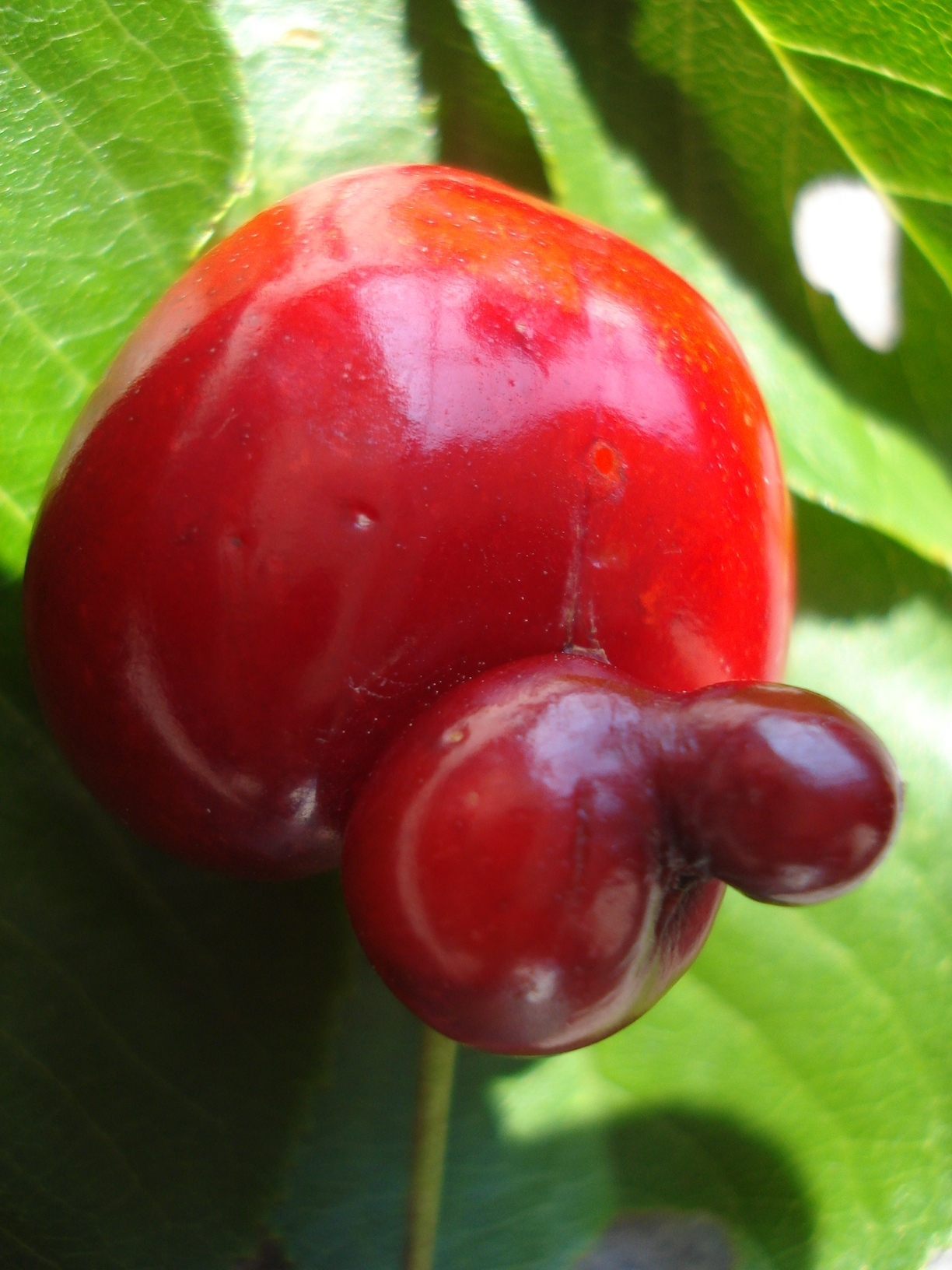
An unusually shaped cherry

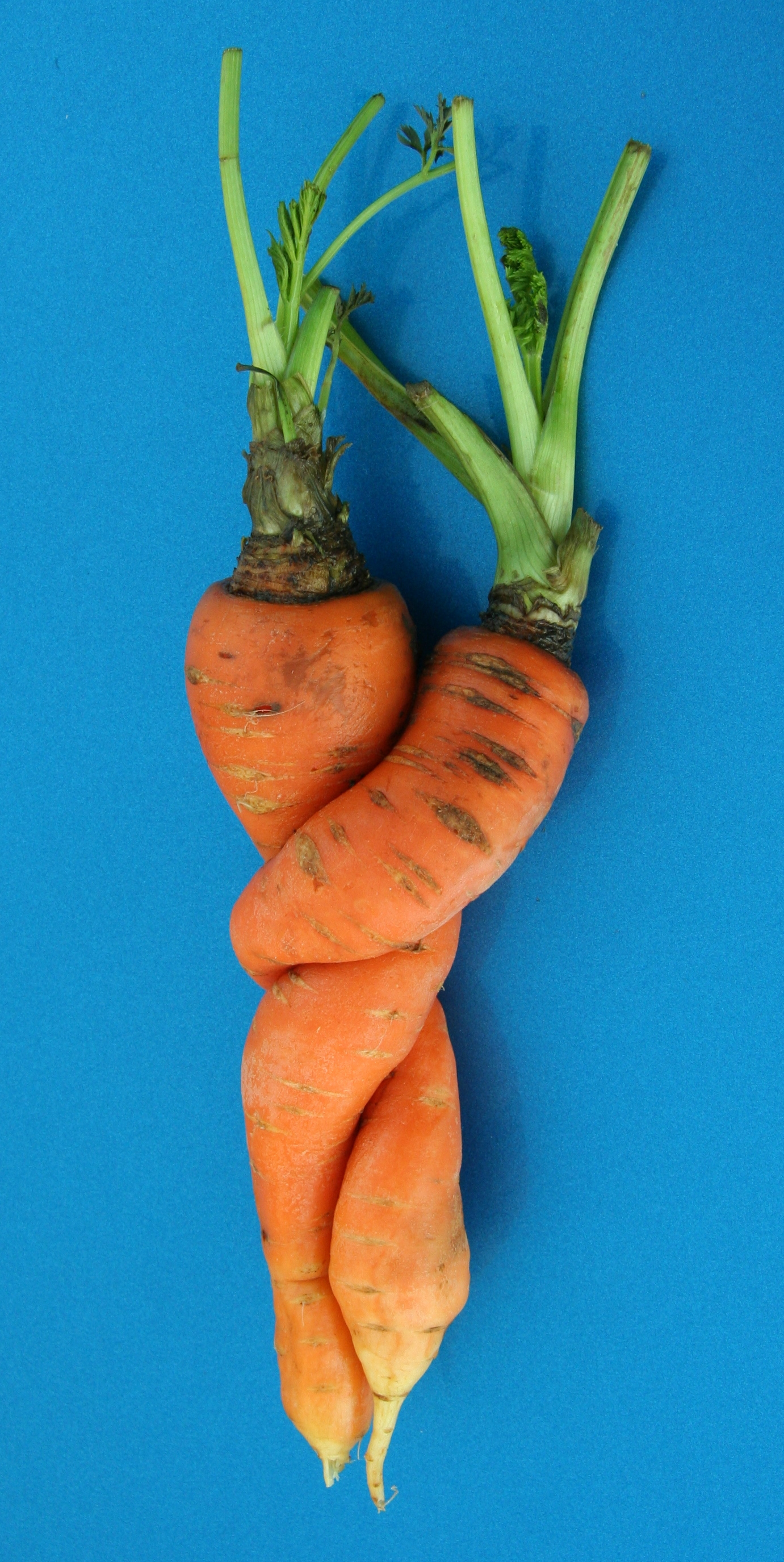
Entwined carrots

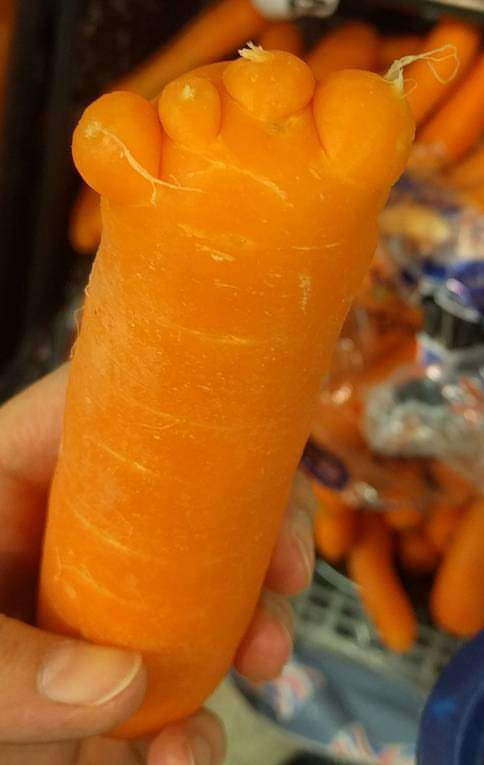
Carrot resembling a foot

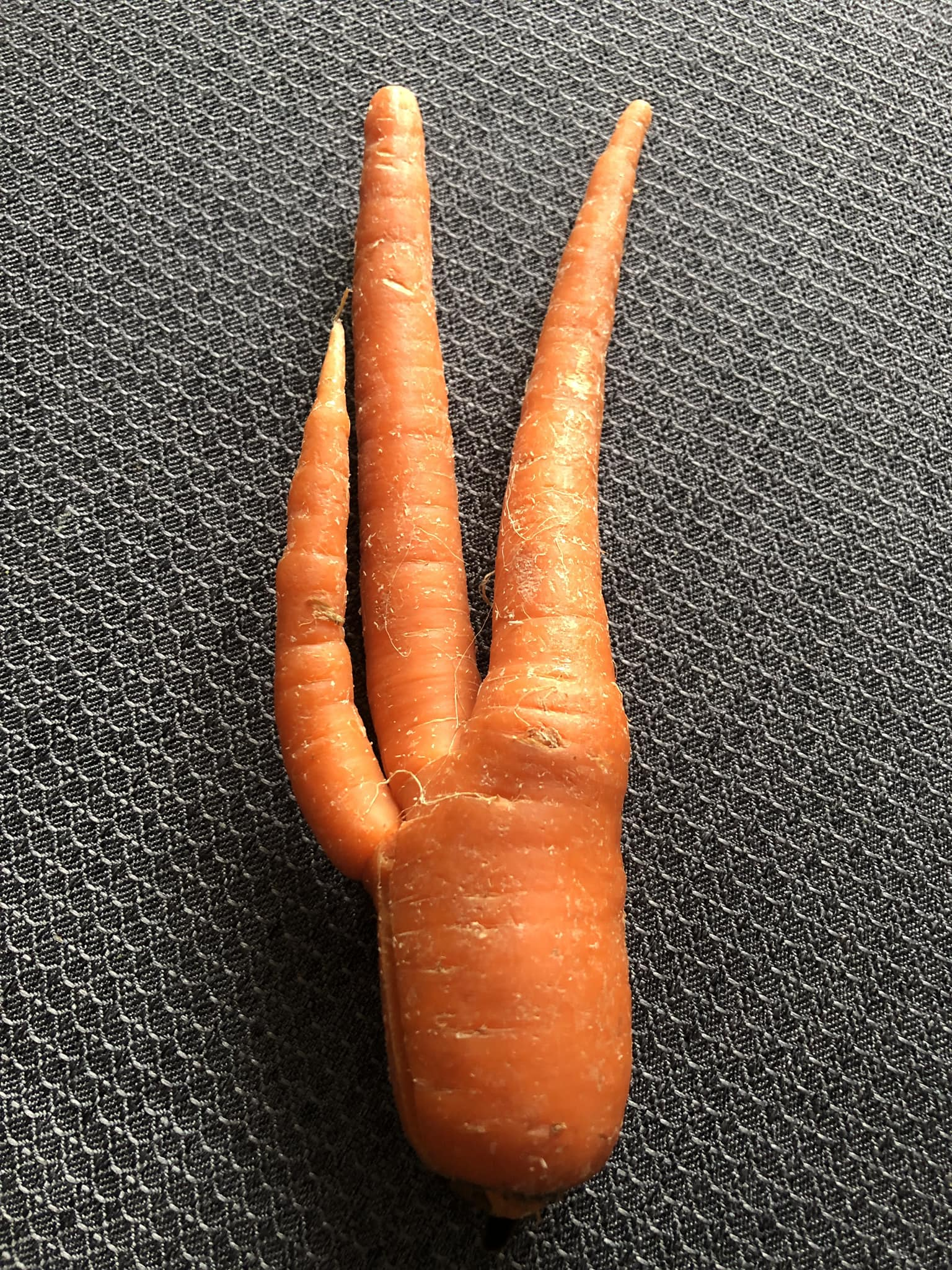
Halloween Carrot

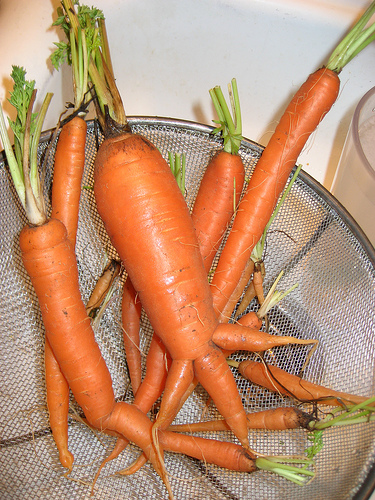
Naturally grown carrots from a small farm in Arizona

== See also ==
- Perceptions of religious imagery in natural phenomena
- Supernumerary body part
- Square watermelon
- Peter pepper
