= Bonsai Kitten =

Hoax website about raising kittens in jars

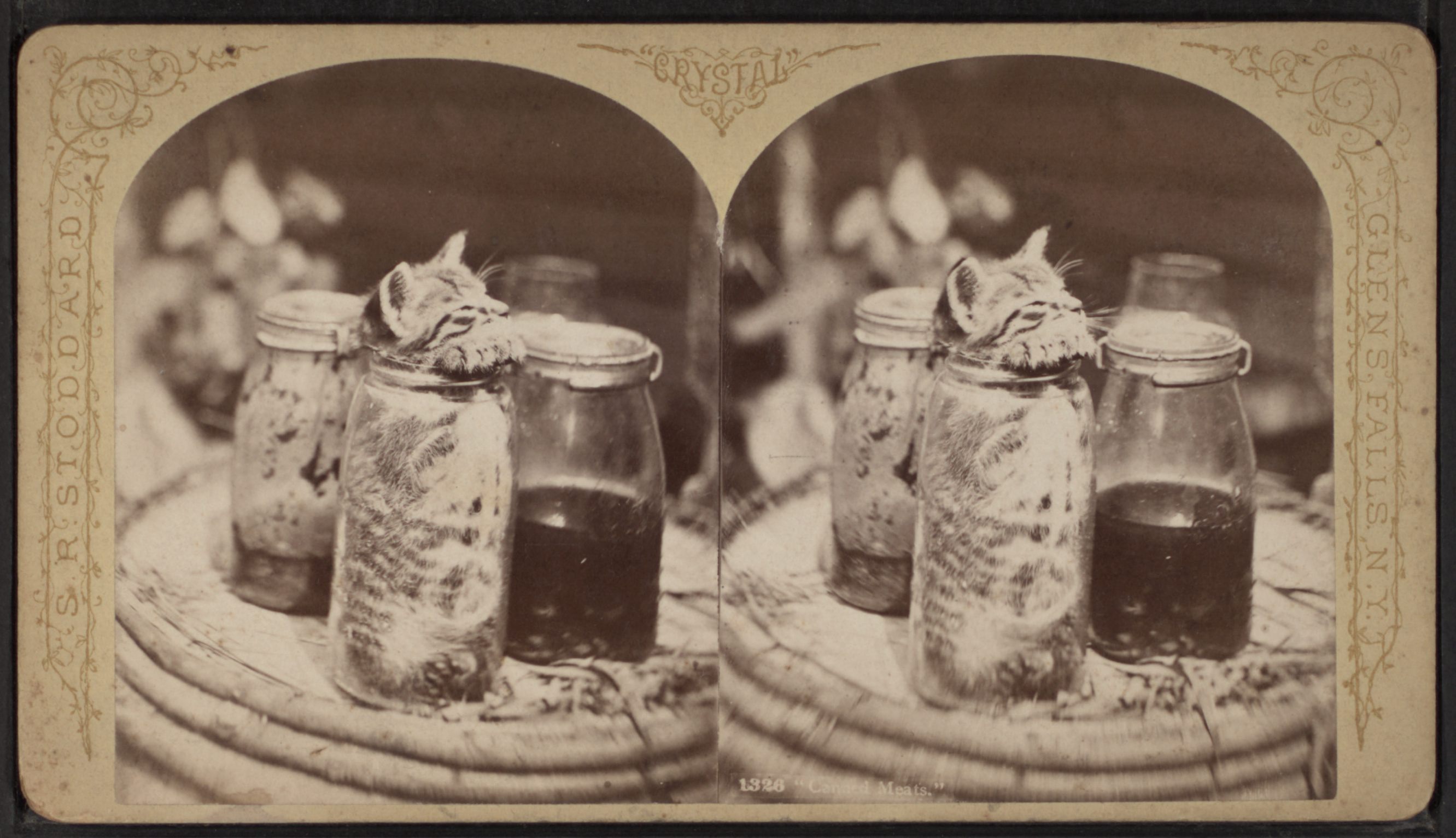
A kitten in a glass jar, similar to how bonsai kittens are allegedly grown

BonsaiKitten.com was a hoax shock site that claimed to raise kittens in jars, so as to mold the bones of the kitten into the shape of the jar as the cat grows, similarly to a bonsai plant. It was launched in 2000 by a Massachusetts Institute of Technology graduate student under the alias of Dr. Michael Wong Chang. Many people believed that the black comedy website was serious, and filed complaints to animal rights organizations and the Federal Bureau of Investigation. The FBI and several other organizations, including Snopes.com and the Humane Society of the United States, debunked the concept of a "bonsai kitten".

The website's legacy remains as a notable example of a hoax site, and generated much discussion about Internet animal cruelty and the issue of free speech.

== Site overview ==
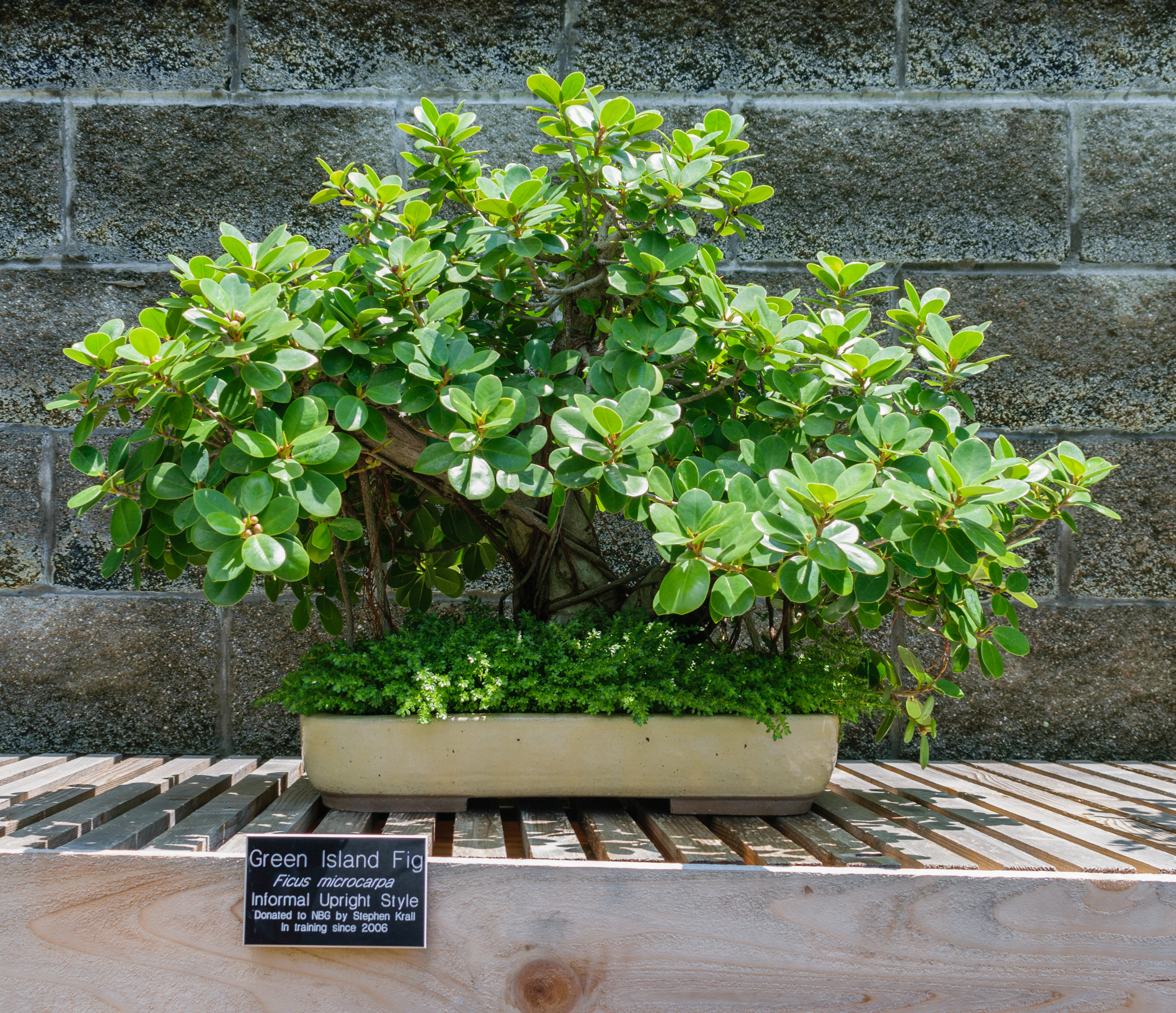
Bonsai trees are the main inspiration for the hoax.

BonsaiKitten.com is dedicated to the "long lost art" of growing "bonsai kittens". The introduction on its homepage invoked orientalism as it describes how the West has long been captivated by the culture of the Far East, such as tattoos, martial arts, and miniature sculpture. It then claims that the concept of miniature sculpture has been famously applied to bonsai trees, it can also be applied to animals, hence its promotion of the bonsai kitten. From here, the visitor can click on a "Method" page, a "Gallery" page, a "Sales" page, and a "News" page.

The "Method" section claims that the skeleton of a week-old kitten is so soft that the kitten will bounce if thrown. It goes on to explain that if one puts the week-old kitten in a glass bottle, it will grow to the same shape as said bottle, and that the bottle can be broken once the cat is the desired size and shape. The "Gallery" page has four images of alleged bonsai kittens in various stages of development. Three of these images supposedly depict the process of creating a bonsai kitten within its first week. The fourth, apparently of a later-stage kitten, warns that, because of "extreme body manipulations" and "the high contrast between bodily fluids and white fur", the image is not for sensitive viewers and thus can only be seen with permission. Those who are still interested are directed to an email, the "Sales" page, to allow for the purchase of live bonsai kittens and the supplies with which to make one's own, with no actual way to purchase either.

The site also featured a guestbook. A number of visitors left complaints about the site's content in the guestbook, though many comments were believed to be jokes. Later additions to the site included "research" indicating that cat litter causes brain damage. The website states that this enhances the bonsai kitten art form's practical value.

=== Website analysis ===
In the book Hippo Eats Dwarf, while discussing infamous hoax sites, author Alex Boese uses the site as an example of what he deemed "the gross-out hoax", a practical joke that is intended to disturb its victim. He writes that the site convinced so many people because disgusting things such as animal cruelty do exist, giving it "built-in credibility".

Some critics noted that in hindsight, an obvious sign that Bonsai Kitten was a hoax was that the site claimed to sell goods, namely live bonsai kittens and supplies for "growing" them, yet had no way to actually purchase the product. The page also offered a New York City-based telephone number, which never responded when called, and which a spokesperson for the American Society for the Prevention of Cruelty to Animals confirmed was not legitimate. Snopes also noted that the process would kill a kitten before the "molding" process could begin. The site's creator would later state that he expected the satire to be obvious, adding that "from our incoming mail, it seems far fewer than 1 percent of respondents understand".

== History ==
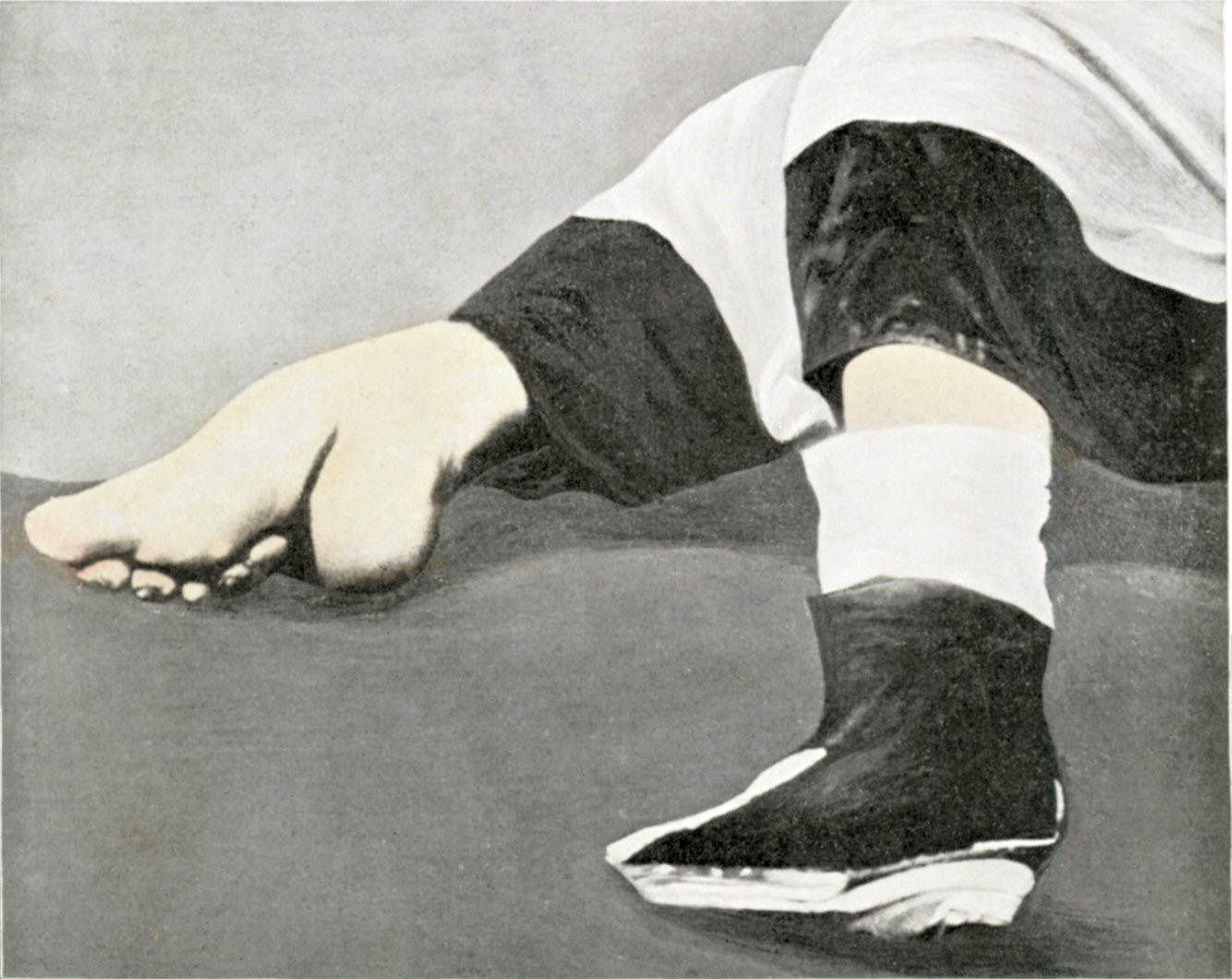
Foot binding, a real-life practice that inspired the website

=== Conception ===
BonsaiKitten.com was created in December 2000 by a graduate student at the Massachusetts Institute of Technology, and was originally hosted on the university's server, on the student's on-campus computer. The student went by the alias "Dr. Michael Wong Chang". In addition to running the website, Chang also held satirical in-person events on campus themed around bonsai kittens, such as "converting" people to "Team Bonsai Kitten" or hosting tutorials on stuffing kittens in jars.

The name "bonsai kitten" is a reference to the art of bonsai, in which trees are grown in small containers and groomed to be certain shapes. The idea of body modification through binding has real-life precedent as well. Bonsai Kitten's homepage also mentions foot binding, a real Chinese custom in which the feet of women were bound to appear more dainty, as an example of the Far East's tradition of sculpting living things.

=== Animal cruelty accusations ===
Very shortly after the creation of the website, controversy arose surrounding the content. Many people believed that the site was serious, and wrote to various animal rights and welfare organizations pleading for investigations. Humane World for Animals (then the Humane Society of the United States) could not determine whether the site was a hoax or not, but called for its termination either way. Other animal advocacy groups did determine that the site was a hoax, but still demanded it be shut down for fear that it could encourage copycat violence. The American Society for the Prevention of Cruelty to Animals said it was "horrified" by the site, along with the larger trend of animal cruelty on the internet, and People for the Ethical Treatment of Animals said that the joke was "inappropriate and certainly not funny", lamenting that it is legal to joke about animal cruelty. In early 2001, the Massachusetts Society for the Prevention of Cruelty to Animals issued a subpoena to MIT for information on the site's owners. They also sent an armed investigator to the campus to gather information, as MSPCA is deputized under state law with arrest abilities.

BonsaiKitten.com was the subject of spam email pleas. Said pleas often targeted non-English speakers, who spread them without fully understanding the text, further allowing misinformation to spread. The website itself received hate emails directly, which by February 2001 had reached the "tens of thousands". Some of the hate was racially motivated; one person wrote to Chang that "you are probably Chinese, the most perverse of the Asians". This was furthered by at least one of the aforementioned spam emails, which claimed that the site was run by "a Japanese" and that the kittens were a popular fashion accessory in Asia.

Some of the site's defenders accused its critics of having double standards. Andrew Smith of The Register noted that Yahoo linked to and categorized multiple crush fetish websites, yet censored a discussion group about Bonsai Kitten. Chang also accused the media of "exploiting ‘distasteful’ subject matter in the guise of information and exploiting it as entertainment", saying that "lurid details of human fault and misery are published in the ‘mainstream’ media for exactly the same reason that certain people exchange this material informally-to titillate the viewer".

=== FBI investigation ===
In February 2001, after receiving numerous complaints, the Boston field office of the Federal Bureau of Investigation issued a grand jury subpoena to MIT concerning the site. The FBI cited a law signed by President Bill Clinton in 1999, prohibiting the possession of animal cruelty depictions commercially released across state lines, as the reason for the investigation. The investigation was praised by Humane World for Animals, but others criticized it. Defense attorney Harvey Silvergate believed that the FBI was motivated by a desire to rebrand their image in a more positive light, saying that "they massively run rampant over Americans' liberties but they want to be seen as nice fuzzy guys who want to protect kittens". Janelle Brown of Yahoo Internet Life viewed it as a free speech violation, writing that "the Bureau believes irony is illegal". Eventually, the FBI concluded that no actual cruelty to animals had taken place.

This was not the only law enforcement investigation into the site. In August 2001, months after the FBI investigation, the Allegheny County district attorney's office received a complaint regarding the site, and launched an investigation that lasted for only a few minutes before the site was deemed a hoax.

=== Aftermath ===
Within a month of its creation, the site was picked up and dropped by eleven different servers. At least two internet service providers dropped the site after pressure from Humane World for Animals. The site was finally picked up by Rotten.com in March 2001, in a move that Chang believed benefitted both himself and Rotten in terms of publicity.

== Legacy ==
In 2021, artists Eva & Franco Mattes created a sculpture called Bonsai Kitten, depicting a taxidermy cat inside a glass jar, which drew inspiration from the hoax website. The hoax is also the namesake for the German rock band Bonsai Kitten.

== See also ==
- BuyTigers.com, another hoax site involving alleged animal cruelty
- Chain letter, a method which helped to spread the hoax
- Comprachicos, an alleged practice performed on children similar to the bonsai kitten hoax
- Foot binding, a real practice that inspired the bonsai kitten hoax
- Impossible bottle, in which things apparently too large are fit into glass bottles
- Square watermelon, a real, similar method for growing watermelons
