= Chinese puzzle ball =

Chinese artifact of carved concentric spheres

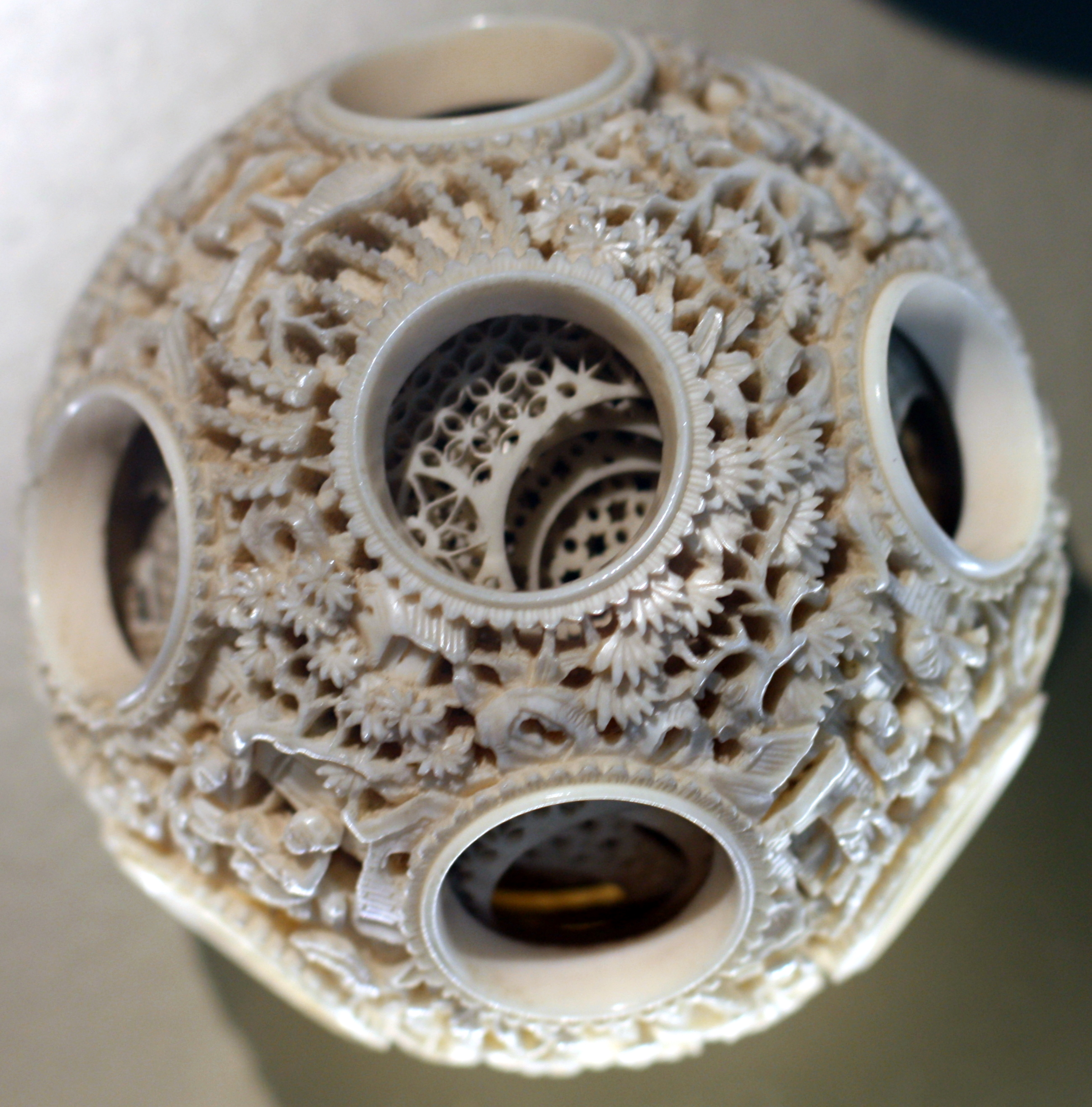
A puzzle ball on display at the Overseas Museum, Bremen

A Chinese puzzle ball, sometimes known as a devil's work ball (Chinese: 鬼工球; pinyin: guǐ gōng qiú) or the Concentric Ball (Chinese: 同心球; pinyin: tóng xīn qiú), is an artifact that consists of a number of intricately carved concentric hollow spheres carved from a single solid block that fit within one another in a way that looks impossible, often consisting of fourteen layers.

They were traditionally made of ivory. Ivory carving is a traditional art and folk craft in ancient China. On May 20, 2006, it was included in the first batch of national intangible cultural heritage list approved by the State Council of the People's Republic of China.

Following the international ban on the ivory trade, manufacturers of puzzle balls have tried using other materials, including bone. 3D imaging using computational tomography has been used to identify details of the manufacturing process.

The name "devil's work ball" likely stems from the Chinese Daoist idiom "gui fu sheng gong" (Chinese: 鬼斧神工; pinyin: guǐ fǔ shén gōng), which translates as "the demon's axe paired with the deity's workmanship," emphasizing the craft's intricate and delicate nature with supernatural connotations.

Originating from Guangdong province, particularly Guangzhou, these intricate balls were originally local tribute items and luxury export goods.

== Historical development ==
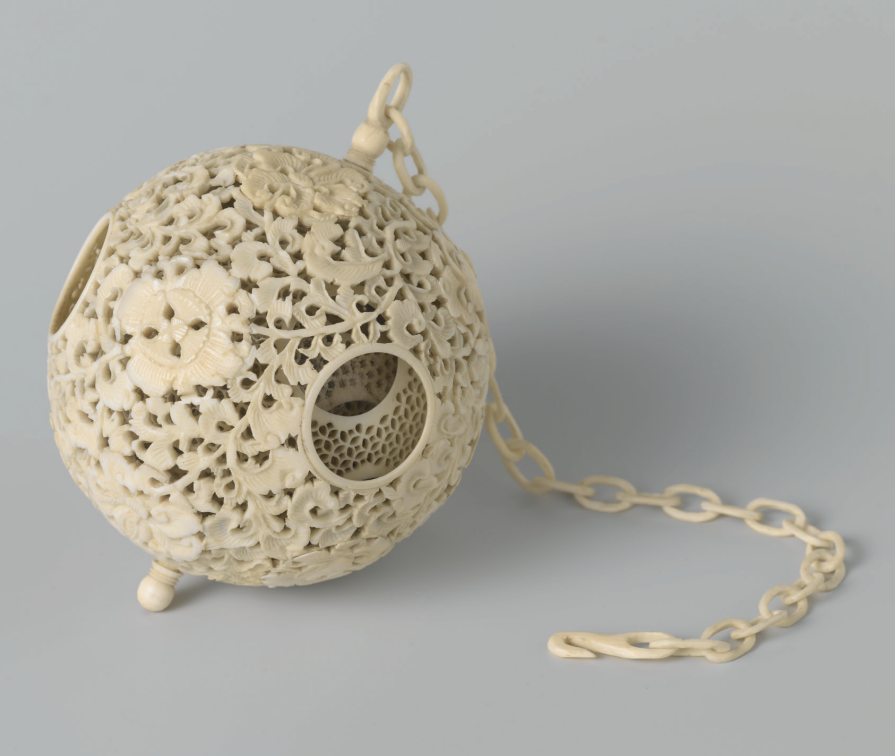
An ivory puzzle ball with nine layers held at the Rijksmuseum in Amsterdam, dating back to 1770–1780 in Canton, China

Although the production of Chinese puzzle balls reached its peak in the eighteenth century during the Qing dynasty, records indicate earlier iterations of puzzle balls during the Song dynasty and Ming dynasty. The earliest mention of Chinese puzzle balls dates back to Cao Zhao's 1338 book Gegu Yaolun (Essential Criteria of Antiques), where he describes seeing an earlier, more simplistic version of the devil's work ball (Chinese: 鬼工球; pinyin: guǐ gōng qiú) he assumed was made by an artisan at the Song dynasty court: "[t]here was a hollow-cantered ivory ball, which had two/multiple concentric layers inside it, all layers can be turned."

The appearance of a 14-layer puzzle ball was noted by Gao Lian in 1591, in Zunsheng bajian (Eight Discourses on the Art of Living), although the artifact he mentioned was made of stone: "Ancient people like to carve this type of stone into circular spheres which were similar to Chinese puzzle ball. I have seen one with twelve layers that from the outermost layer to the innermost one was diminishing in size and each layer could revolve. The innermost sphere was as tiny as a green bean. How it was made I do not know. It was 'true devil's work'."

In 1792, Wang Qishu reported seeing thirteen-layer puzzle balls being sold in Guangzhou (Canton).

Ching-fei Shih argued that Chinese puzzle balls were influenced by European geometric carved ivory balls due to similarities in craftsmanship and the use of turning lathes in modern production. The Sotheby's catalogue, 2017, tells that "The earliest known example [of contrefait] is a sphere turned by Giovanni Ambrogio Maggiore of Milan in 1582 now preserved in the Museo degli Argenti in Florence. Egidius Lobenigk of Dresden was another innovator of the form, and in the Grünes Gewölbe there are four signed spheres of the early 17th century by Georg Friedel".

Klaus Maurice observed that "Chinese balls’ are always worked manually with long curved cutters, never mechanically on a rose engine. It requires a great deal of skill to make twenty or more shells like onion skins – each diminishing in size and some in relief – out of or in an ivory sphere, but certainly not a machine (so typical of the West)". However, Bing Huang notes that "it had been common in China before the rule of the Qianlong emperor for artisans to use lathes to produce artefacts". She also suggests that China and Europe may have exchanged knowledge about polyhedral geometry through German Jesuit missions, leading to improved craftsmanship in both regions.

== Production and trading ==
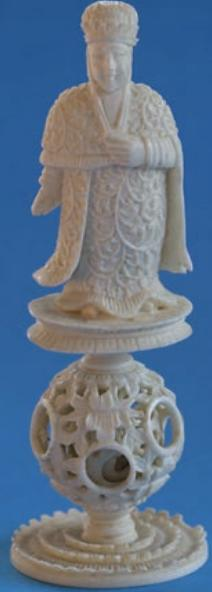
Ivory bishop piece with a Chinese puzzle ball in the base, from a Cantonese chess set

Chinese puzzle balls are believed to have originated in Canton, where there was a thriving artisanal sector and easy access to raw ivory, allowing artisans to show off their dexterity and technical prowess with the intricate carving required to make these items.

Production of the ivory puzzle balls became more common due to the thriving artisanal export industry that emerged in Canton after 1760 when the government restricted foreign merchants to that region. From the 1730s onwards, artisans in Canton started intentionally making puzzle balls for mass tributes to the emperor. The puzzle balls of the best quality were selected by the Tribute Bureau officials to be brought to the imperial court.

Those not deemed fit for the emperor’s court were then sold commercially in domestic and export arts markets. Design motifs commonly carved on puzzle balls include auspicious symbols such as Chinese dragons, floral patterns, geometric shapes, and Chinese characters. Dragon motifs were an especially common design when puzzle balls were made as tributes, as they depict the power of the Manchurian and Qing emperors, since they symbolized immortality and the emperor's travel between heaven and earth .

Chinese puzzle balls held an appeal as a status symbol in China as well as in Europe. At the imperial court in China, puzzle balls were another form of decoration that conspicuously flaunted the emperor’s wealth and ability to wield the labour and talent of the populace. Chinese puzzle balls also appealed to government officials, literati scholars, and any other upper-class elites who aimed to project sociopolitical status with this purchase by showing it off in their homes . Artworks made of ivory carried social prestige in both China and Europe due to being a rare, delicate, as well as costly material that only a privileged few could own, much less pay to have crafted, historically.

Art collectors in Europe also collected ivory Chinese puzzle balls as objects of wonder that represented Chinese exotic culture and development. In response to the popularity of this export, Chinese artisans developed innovative works for European export such as Cantonese chess sets that contain miniature puzzle balls in their base. However, the production of Chinese puzzle balls slowed down starting in the early 20th century as carved ivory trade suffered with the economic and political upheavals of that time.

== Production process ==
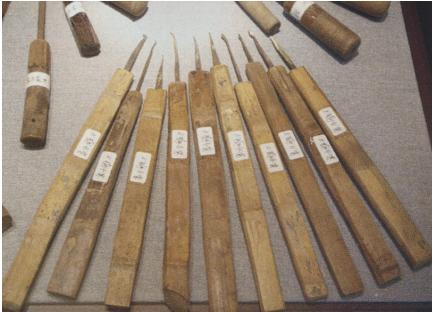
Carving tools used to create the intricate designs on Chinese ivory puzzle balls, displayed at the Guangdong Folk Art Museum in Guangzhou, China

Chinese puzzle balls are created through a time-consuming process of intricate carving and nesting. First the artisan must start by selecting a suitable piece of material, traditionally ivory, and then turning it into a sphere, often with a lathe. As the next step, geometric modelling on paper is typically used to map out the creation of the puzzle ball, so that the creator can ensure that all peepholes that will be drilled into the puzzle ball have the same diameter and there is consistent distance between layers. Fourteen peepholes are drilled with conical-shaped incisions, before the carver then goes in with L-shaped scalpels to separate the different layers of the ivory puzzle ball so that each can dynamically move independently of the others. The painstaking nature of this stage is conveyed by ivory puzzle-ball master Weng Rongbiao, who said in a live demonstration that it would take an experienced master at least 30 hours to separate 30 layers of a single ivory puzzle ball. Finally, open-work geometric patterns are then carved onto each layer by the artisan, before the artisan then polishes the outer layer in the final step.

Artisans use lathes to turn the ivory puzzle balls as they carve them manually with hand-held tools, with lathes historically being foot-powered in China, though modern artisans use electric lathes . The geometric patterns in each layer are carved by "punching" a small knife into the ivory once for every line in a shape, meaning that small delicate tools the same width as each interior shape's side must be used. Historically, Guangdong master turners also had to be skilled ironsmiths who produced their own carving tools, with apprentices learning to forge iron tools before being taught how to create puzzle balls.

== Artisan craftsmanship ==
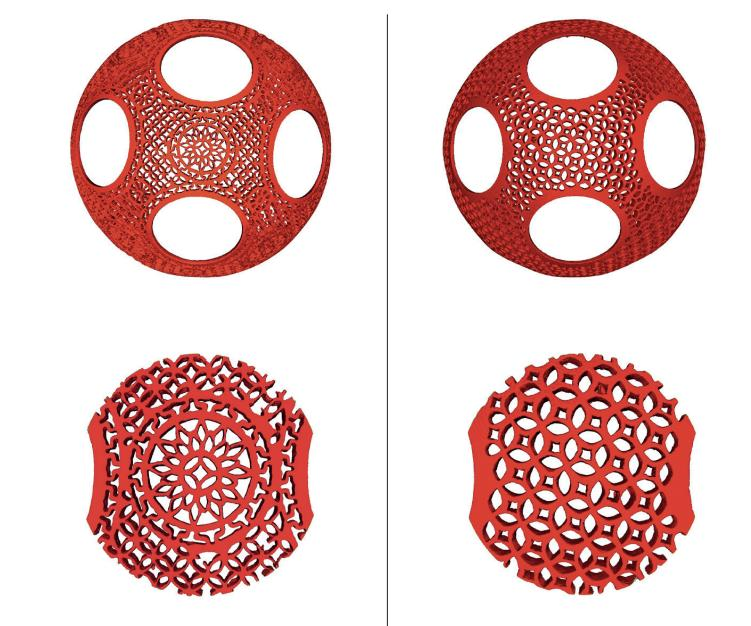
3D renderings of the punched patterns on layer 2 of the Chinese puzzle ball held at the Rijksmuseum

The craft of creating Chinese puzzle balls, developed in family workshops in Guangdong, has been passed down through generations since the Qianlong period. For instance, the Weng family is famous for their master refinement of this artisanal craft. The family's reputation originated with Weng Wuzhang who achieved fame for producing an eleven-layer ivory puzzle ball for the Qing court in the Qianlong period, before tracing down to Weng Yaoxiang, the newest fifth-generation master who has produced an ivory puzzle ball with fifty-seven layers in 2003. This is the most layers that have ever been created in a puzzle ball so far.

Many ivory-carving craftsman families saw the craft as a lucrative career craft, especially since smooth carved ivory balls receiving commissions of only 6,000 yuan.

Researchers have used X-ray, CT scan, and computer image-visualization tools to confirm that every inner sphere in a puzzle ball is carved and decorated, albeit less richly the closer the layer is to the innermost sphere. These methods also allow researchers to see the accuracy and consistency of the carvings done by Chinese puzzle ball artisans. This is an alternative to having to break apart the puzzle ball to see inside it well, due to how little light filters into the center of the small artifacts and the tiny delicate size of the carvings. Simplistic light simulations performed on 3D renderings confirm the visual difficulty of carving the puzzle ball, with results showing that crafters have sufficient direct light on the first few layers but reduced light on deeper layers.

== Materials and modern challenges ==
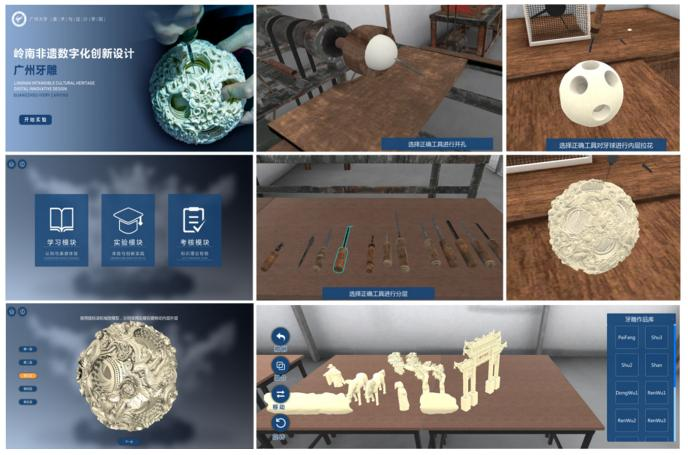
The virtual simulation platform where learners can practice carving a simulated ivory puzzle ball using simulated tools identical to the ones real puzzle ball carvers use

The production and trading of Chinese puzzle ball are currently impeded by the ban on the processing and sales of ivory enacted at the end of 2017 by China's State Forestry Administration (SFA). This followed the nearly complete ban on the import and export of ivory enacted in 2015 by the SFA . Like other nations’ bans on ivory sales, a major cause of this ban is the current endangerment of African forest elephant and Southeast Asia caused by poaching. Ivory for artisan craftwork in China was historically sourced from indigenous elephant populations before climate change, habitat destruction for agriculture, and the hunting of elephants as a cultural delicacy and ivory source resulted in elephants migrating south to other Asian regions.

From the advent of the Chinese puzzle ball during the Ming and Qing dynasties onwards, ivory for this craft was imported from Africa and Southeast Asia, which is where most of the world's ivory is still sourced today. Consumers in Asia, particularly China, are responsible for high ivory consumption. A study by CITES found that an increase in the poaching of elephants was positively correlated with increases in China's household consumption, especially because ivory products are often marketed as arts investments in China. Chinese puzzle balls, like many other ivory carved goods in China, hold market appeal as traditional aesthetic items and speculative cultural commodities.

China previously included ivory carving in its UNESCO Intangible Cultural Heritage Lists in May 2006, attempting to acquire status as an ivory-trading nation and only banning illegal ivory trading, in order to allow these culturally-unique artisans to continue their work. However, legal markets for ivory products have been shut down currently, posing a threat to the craft.

Chinese puzzle ball artisans are instead forced to adapt to the new restrictions in ivory by using tusks or bone as an alternative material. However, this has increased the price of mammoth tusk, and since it is not a regenerative resource, the supply is estimated to only last another fifty years. The alternative is to source ivory illegally and then sell the ivory puzzle balls on the illegal goods markets. As a result, many carving masters worry that they will be unable to pass down their skills to future generations due to the restrictions on ivory processing, especially because the current substitute materials handle differently than ivory, making it difficult to teach the craft in the same way.

As many masters become older and lose their eyesight, there will be little remaining time to pass down this craft to the next generation of Chinese puzzle ball artisans. However, cultural preservation initiatives have attempted to create virtual simulations of the process of carving puzzle balls and other ivory artifacts, and a program to learn how to carve a puzzle ball digitally is offered at Guangzhou University. This allows learners to learn from videos of masters and practice the skill virtually, and preserves the craftsmanship technique in a permanent way for when new suitable materials for Chinese puzzle balls can be discovered.
