= Wang Qishu =

Wang Qishu (1728–1799) was a Chinese art collector, seal carver, poet, and politician. He was a collector of seals during the Qing dynasty.

A native of She County Huizhou, Wang was born into moderate wealth. Although he initially planned to take the Imperial examinations and become an official, he eventually went into the family business as a salt merchant. Despite this, his donations to the government's coffers resulted in an official court position and he spent several years in Beijing fulfilling an administrative role.

His interest in seal carving led him to collect thousands of seals and imprints, and during the course of his life he published more than twenty books cataloguing his collection.

Although he wrote poetry, Wang was never highly regarded as a writer by his contemporaries, who nevertheless admired him for his work as a collector. He also edited the Xie fang ji ("Collected fragrances"), an anthology of women's poetry.
