= Sapi-Portuguese Ivory Spoon =

Sapi artifact

The Sapi-Portuguese Ivory Spoon was created by an unknown Sapi artist in the 16th century. The carving that makes up part of the handle of the spoon was based on European iconography but the design reflects the stylistic traditions of the Sapi people of West Africa made solely in West Africa.

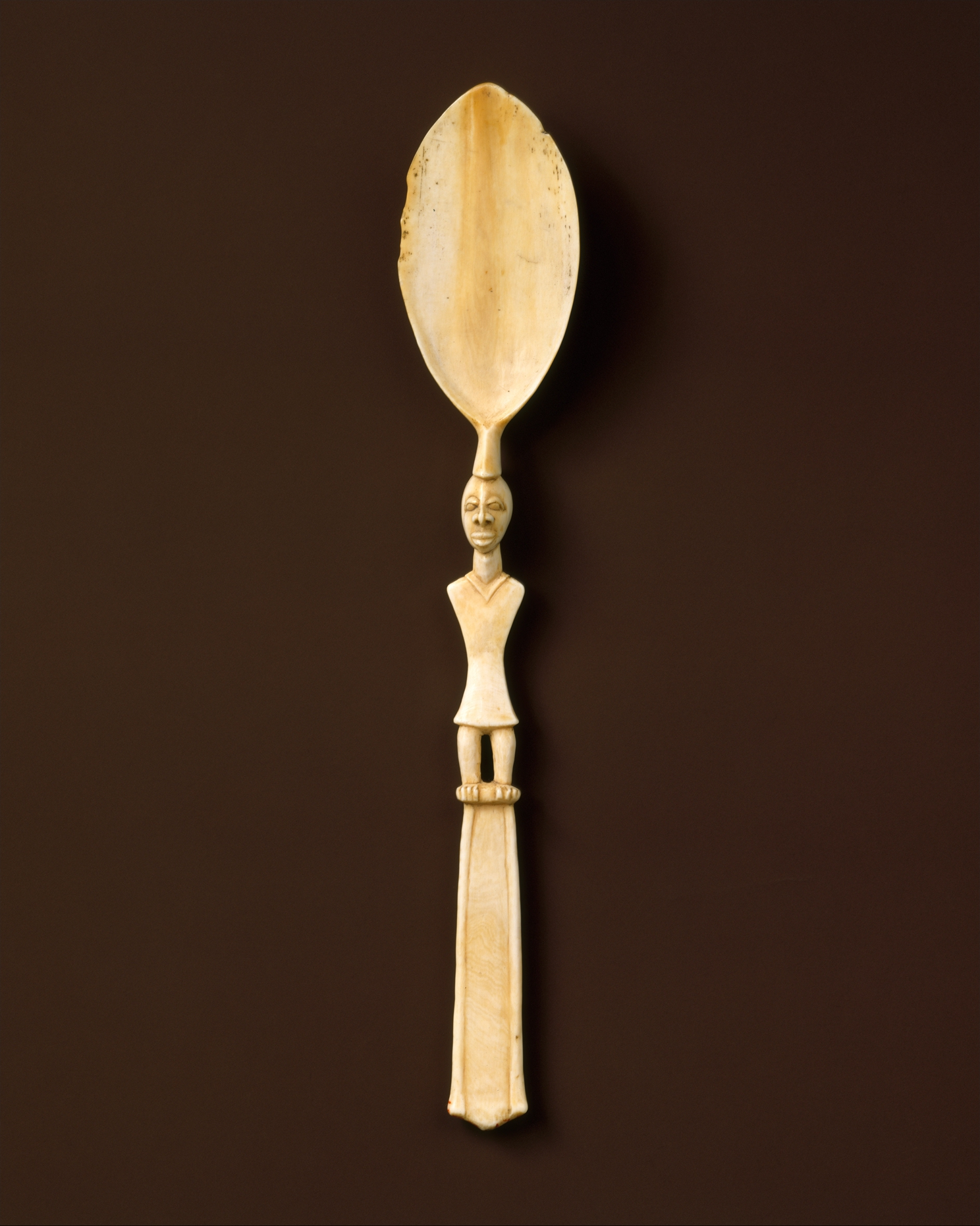
Sapi-Portuguese Ivory Spoon

== Background ==
This ivory spoon carving is believed to have been created by a Sapi artist. Sapi was a name used by Portuguese traders to describe the people that lived along the coast of Sierra Leone, a country on the southwestern coast of Africa bordered by Guinea and Liberia. During the 15th and 16th centuries, the time frame in which this piece was created, the Portuguese dominated global trade, with ports all over the world, including India, Brazil, and Sierra Leone. The Portuguese sought out gold, ivory, and pepper from Africa as those were their main exports. Ivory was a particularly valuable resource because the strong material was used to make durable everyday items like utensils. Ivory was often associated with power, this could be because it came from elephants, one of the largest mammals on the planet and because of this it wasn’t an abundant resource.

== Visual analysis ==
The Sapi ivory spoon is not all that dissimilar to modern spoons. The spoon is carved out of a single section of ivory. The eating end of the spoon takes the shape of an oblong, shallow bowl shape with a small neck that connects the bowl of the spoon to its handle. The middle of the handle is composed of a small, simple carving of a Sapi person. The figure is carved and with distinct facial features but a simplified body with no arms. Approximately halfway down the handle the body ends at the feet and the handle continues down with a very simple symmetrical design. Similar symmetrical design, facial features, clothing styles are often seen in other works from this time. Examples of these simulates would seen in be other ivory spoons or lidded saltcellars from the same time period and location.

== Examples of similar style work from the time and location ==
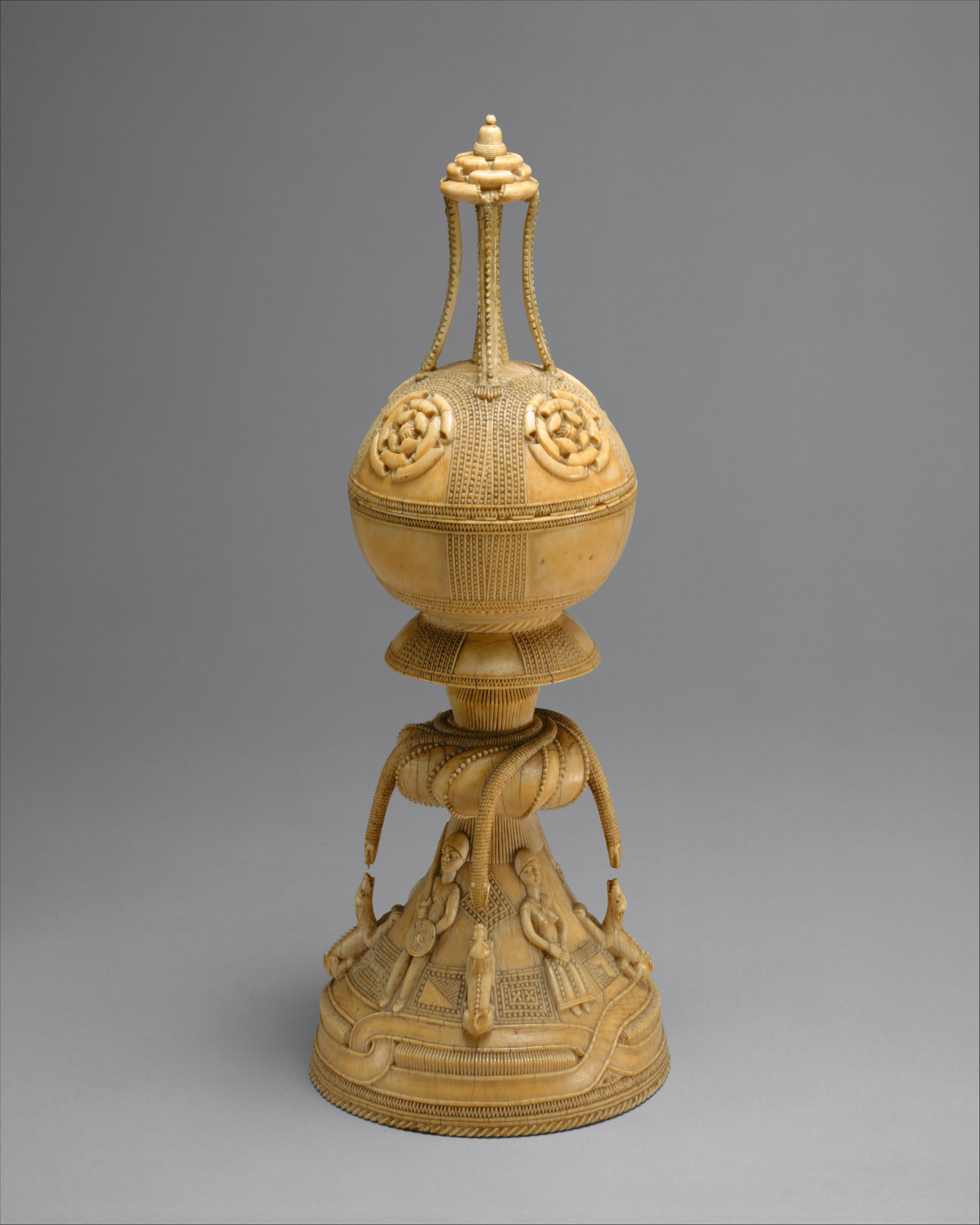
Ivory Lidded Saltcellar

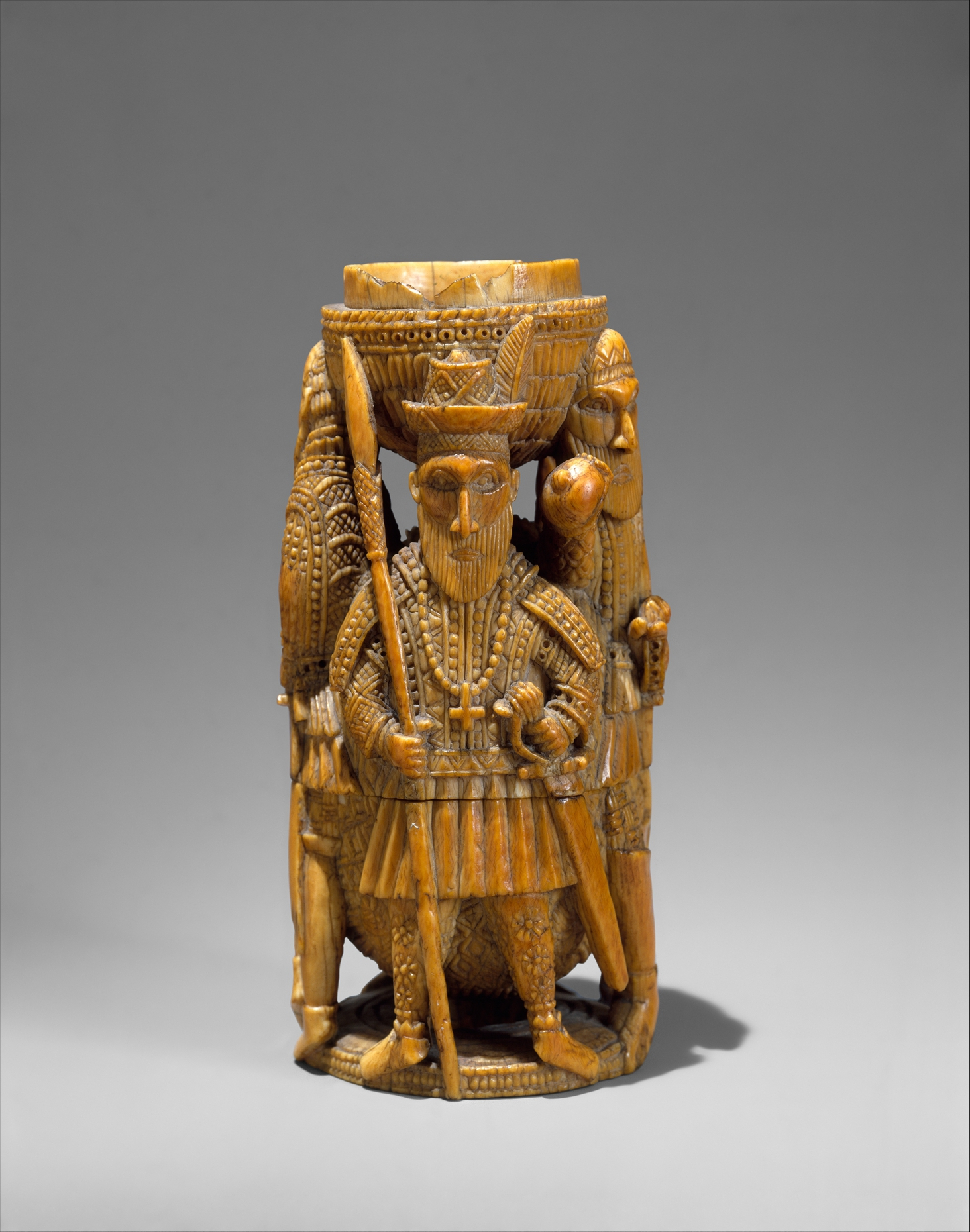
Saltcellar with Portuguese Figures
