= Saltcellar with Portuguese Figures =

16th century ivory saltcellar made in the Kingdom of Benin

Bini-Portuguese Ivory Salt Cellar
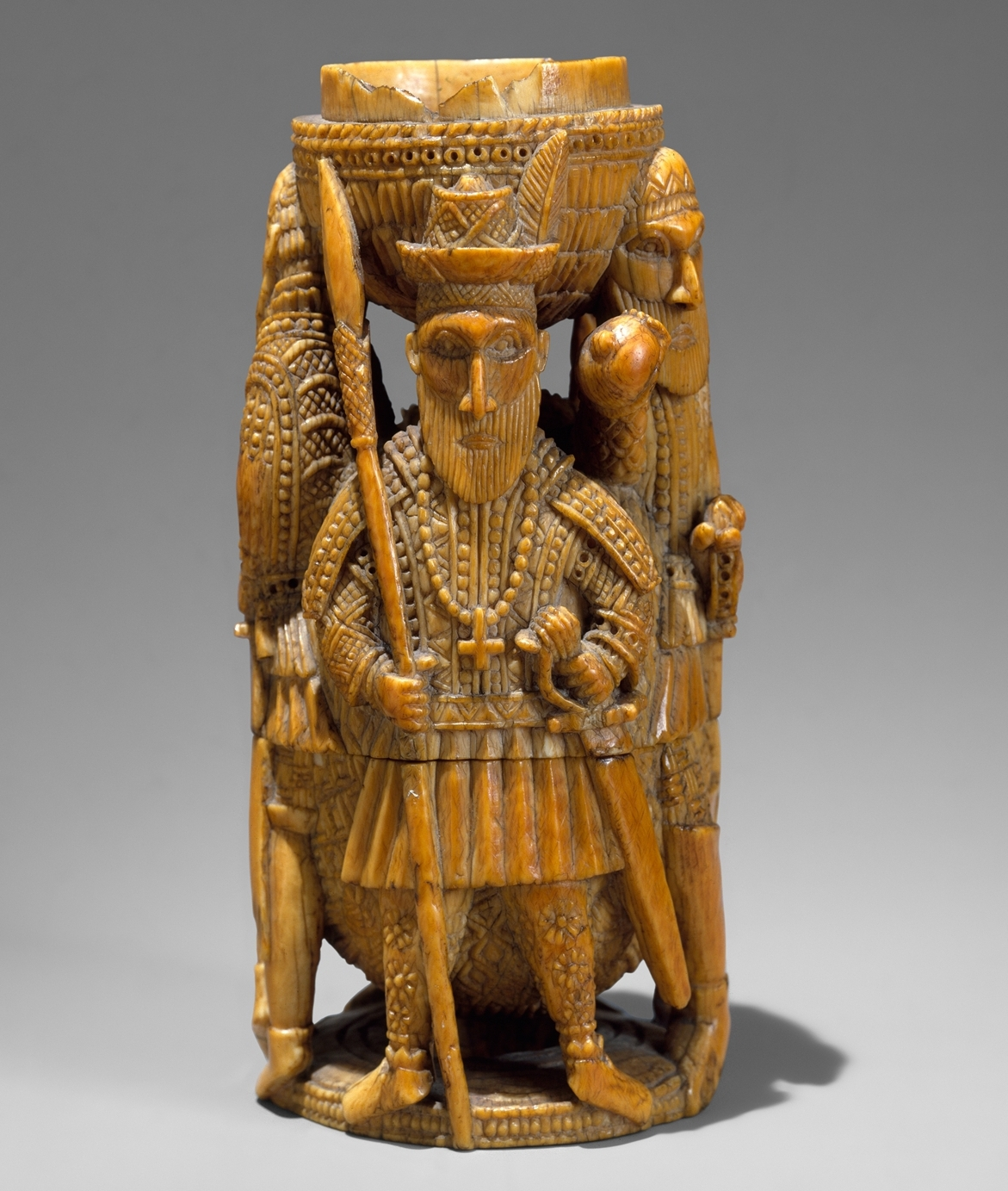
- Front angle of salt cellar.
- Artist: Unknown
- Year: ca. 1525-1600
- Medium: Ivory
- Subject: Portuguese explorers
- Dimensions: 19.1 cm × 7.6 cm × 8.3 cm (7 1/2 in × 0.3 in × 3 1/4 in)
- Location: Metropolitan Museum of Art, New York City
- Accession: 1972.63a, b
- Website: Museum page

The Saltcellar with Portuguese Figures is a salt cellar in carved ivory, made in the Kingdom of Benin in West Africa in the 16th century, for the European market. It is attributed to an unknown master or workshop who has been given the name Master of the Heraldic Ship by art historians. It depicts four Portuguese figures, two of higher class and the other two are possibly guards protecting them. In the 16th century, Portuguese visitors ordered ivory salt cellars and ivory spoons similar to this object. This Afro-Portuguese ivory salt cellar was carved in the style of a Benin court ivory, comparable to the Benin Bronzes and Benin ivory masks.

These kinds of ivory arts were commissioned and exported initially from Sierra Leone and later Benin City, Nigeria. During the age of exploration European powers expanded their trade and efforts towards establishing trade posts in the New World, Africa, the Middle East and Asia. Portuguese sailors disembarked from their caravels to buy goods for trading like ivory, gold, and others. These goods were taken from markets to colonial outposts to Portugal and then traded within European markets. During the 16th and 17th century countries that participated in colonialism reaped the economical benefits from its international trade.

The salt cellar was probably carved for a Portuguese nobleman to put it on his dining table. It is one of four almost identical pieces, probably made as a set. Two are in the British Museum and one in the National Museum of Scotland. A fifth one in Berlin was lost or destroyed during the Second World War. Ivory salt cellars and ivory spoons like the Sapi-Portuguese Ivory Spoon, also in the Metropolitan Museum of Art, were common pieces of art that Portuguese sailors brought back from West African countries. There are no records of the order for this commission but it is believed that a Benin Ivory carver produced this in the Benin Kingdom, in modern day Nigeria.

== Description ==
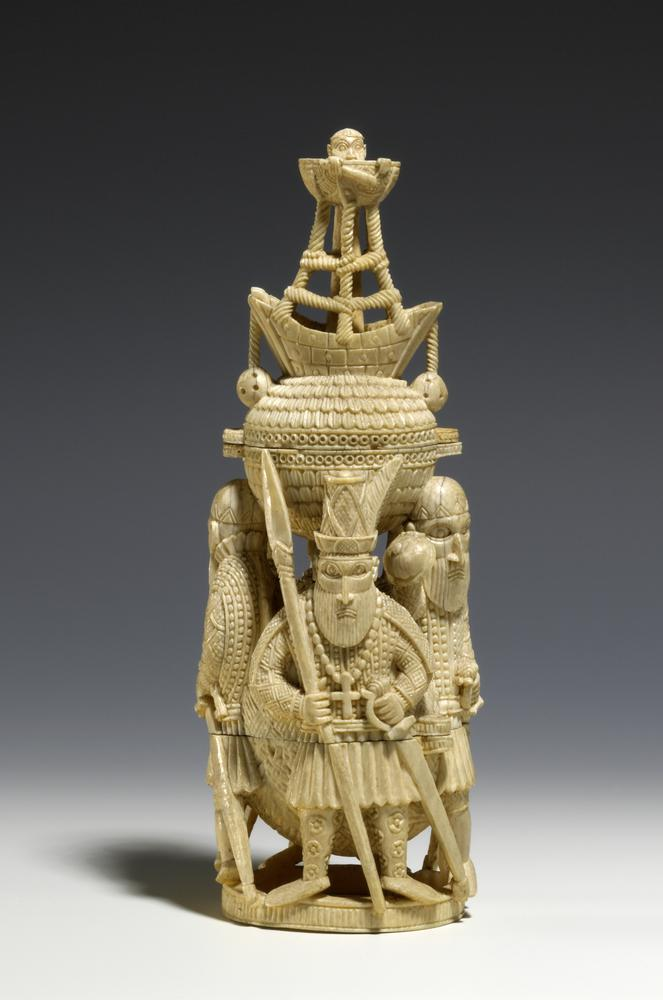
More complete example of another similar saltcellar by the same artist in the British Museum

The figures, in high relief form a circle around the shaft of the elephant tusk, supporting the bowl at top used to hold the salt. The amount and type of decoration indicates that this piece was created in a Benin court. Two of the four male figures are from clearly of a higher rank, probably from a higher class. They are more elaborately carved and shown frontally, while the other two have less ornament and are shown in profile. The men on the front and on the back are dressed with elaborate clothes with a cross necklace, showing they are European Christians. In addition they are wearing hats and holding spears in their left hand.

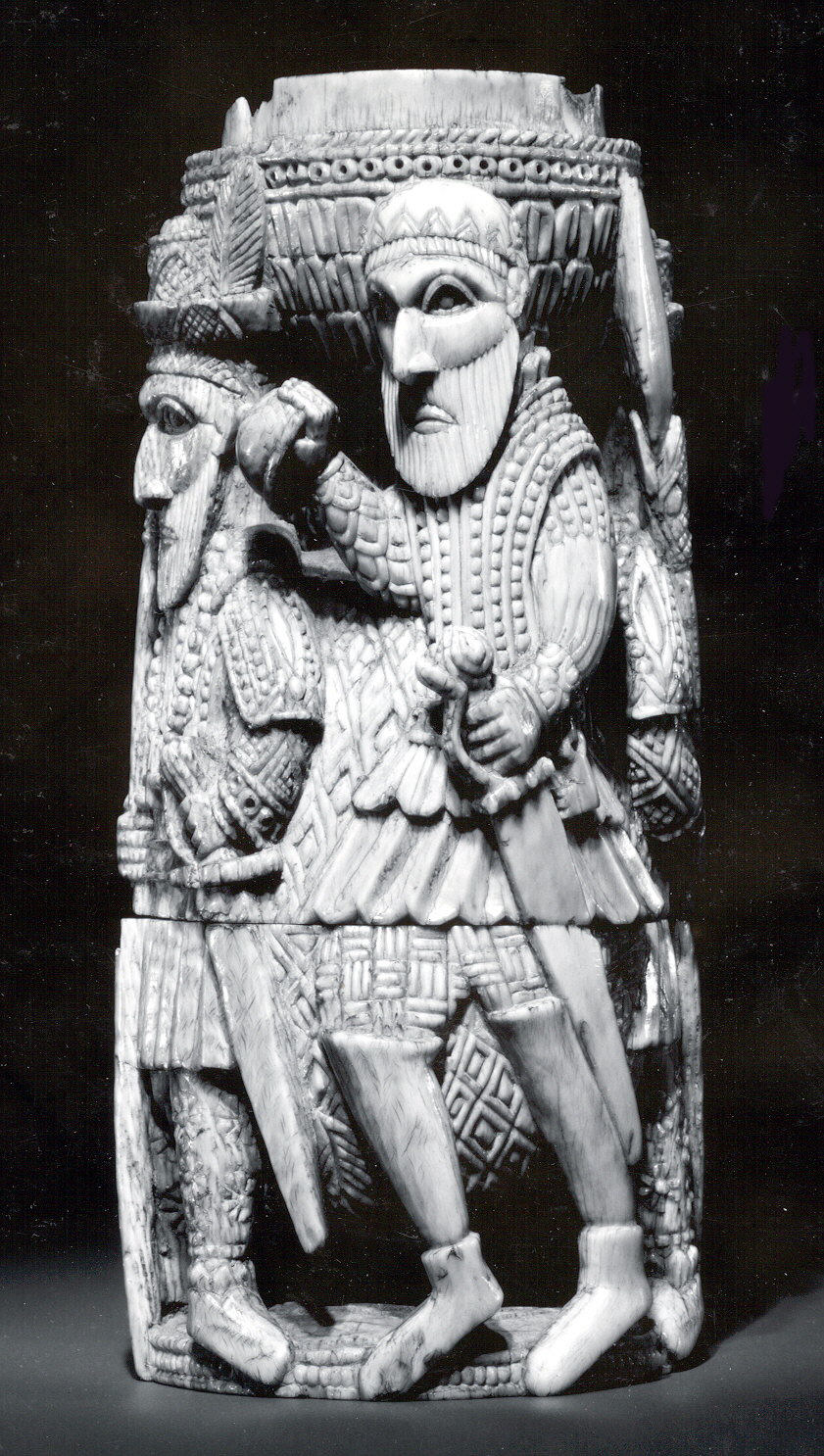
Left view of ivory salt cellar

The style used to carve the ivory piece may be intended to be somewhat grotesque. In Afro-Portuguese ivories there are three African elements that are fundamental to call a piece African art: a focus on the human figure, an enunciation of the parts and a preference for pure geometric forms. Individuals are presented as the main subject in African art usually depicting an important figure like royalty or a deity, this is shown in the ivory salt cellar and other Benin Bronzes. The faces of each man are bigger with their long beards and deep eyes than their body while keeping their proportions in check. The geometry of the pattern of the men's clothing, the socket of the spear is another example where this geometry is repeated.

== Background ==
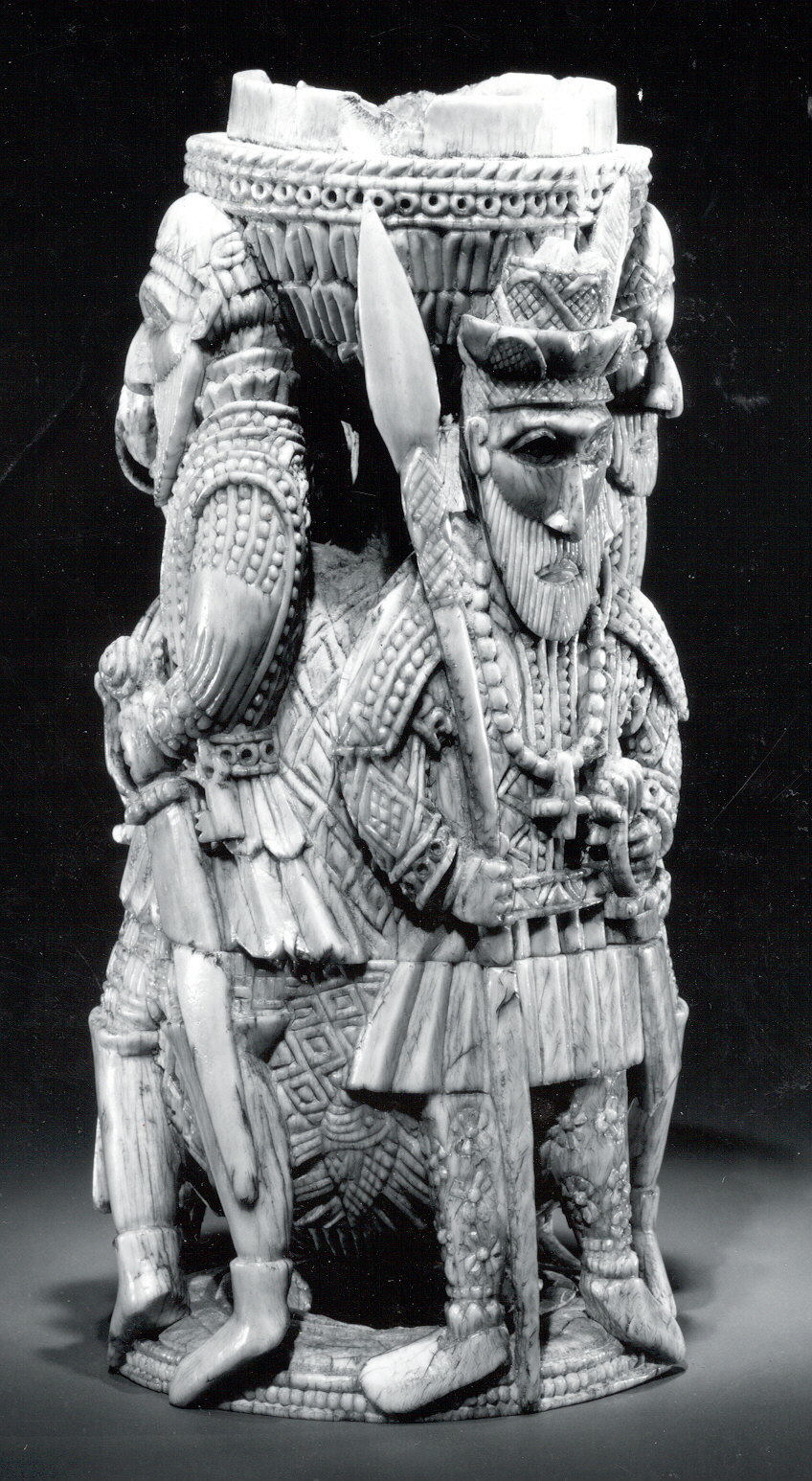
Right view of ivory salt cellar

The kingdom of Benin existed in the southwestern region of Nigeria in modern Edo state, Nigeria. According to scholars the kingdom of Benin (also known as the Edo Kingdom, or the Benin Empire) originated around the year 900 by the Ogiso kings, it is said between the eleventh and the thirteenth a member from the Oba dynasty would take control of the state. This dynasty would rule until 1897 when the British occupied the kingdom of Benin in February 9. The kingdom reached its peak during the rule of Ewuare the Great, he ruled from 1440 to 1473. King Ewuare expanded its natural borders and introduced wood and ivory carving to the kingdom. One of the first recorded visits to Benin City was made by Portuguese explorer, João Afonso de Aveiro in 1486. After contact with the Portuguese the Benin Kingdom established a strong mercantile relationship with Portugal and later other European states. They traded slaves and Beninese products such as ivory, pepper, gold and palm oil for European goods such as manillas, metals and guns. In addition they established diplomatic relations in the late 15th century, the Oba sent an ambassador to Lisbon, and the king of Portugal sent Christian missionaries to Benin City in 1486.
