= Sapi Saltceller =

Saltceller on display at the Metropolitan Museum of Art

Lidded Saltcellar
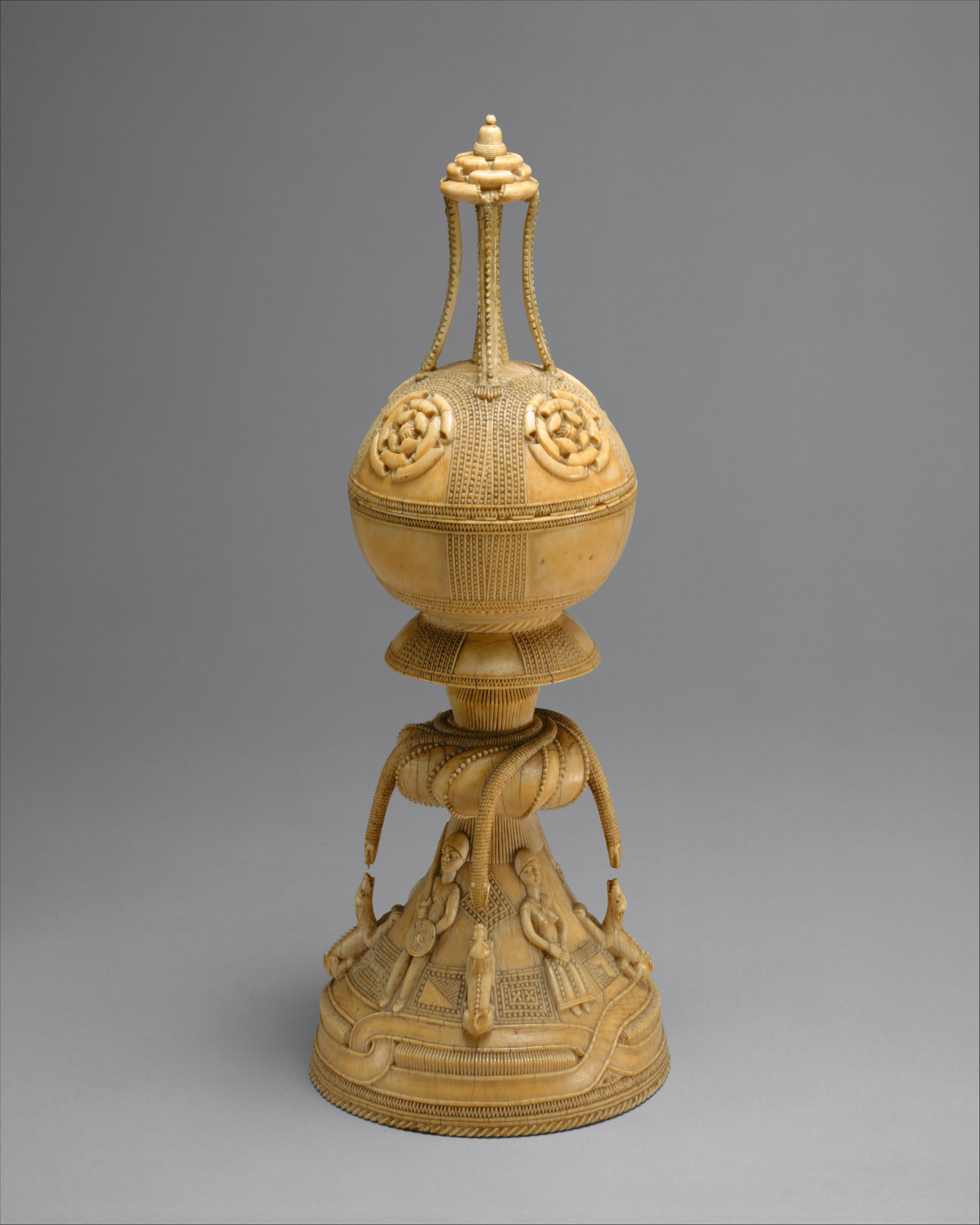
- Year: c. 15th-16th century
- Medium: Ivory, bone
- Location: Metropolitan Museum of Art

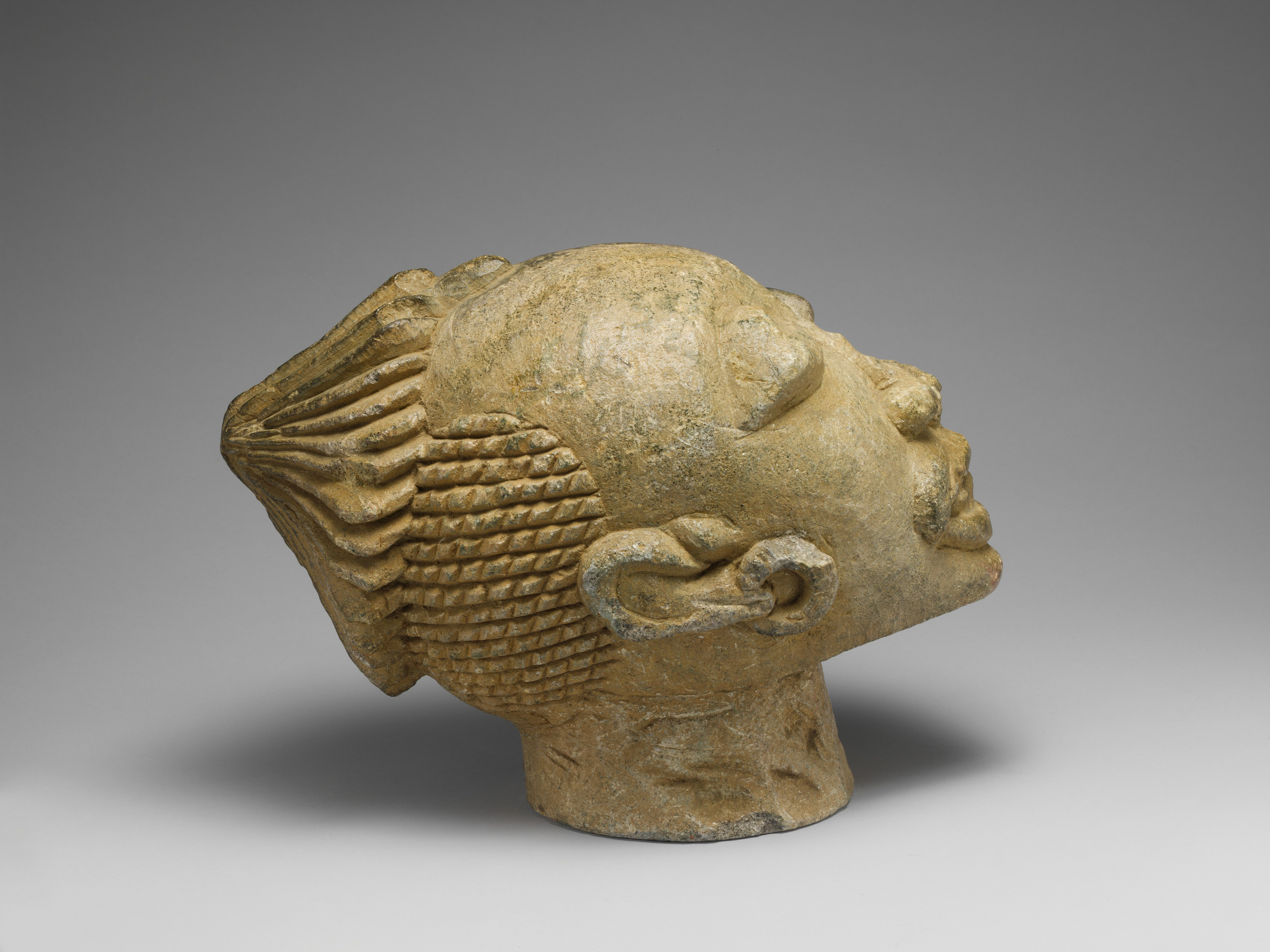
Figure Head :Sapi People

The collection of the Metropolitan Museum of Art contains a lidded saltceller. Crafted in either 15th or 16th century Sierra Lione, the item is on view at The Met Fifth Avenue in Gallery 352.

== Background ==
Ivory carving was a traditional part of West African art. It was one of the most valuable curiosities from Africa that caught the eyes of travellers. In what is now Sierra Leone, the Sapi people were noted for producing ivory pieces for export. When Portuguese traders pushed for trade along the ivory and grain coasts in the late 15th century, they began to commission local artisans to produce intricately designed ivory vessels, receptacles, and boxes for export to Europe. Given the valuable nature of ivory, these containers were typically only used to hold valuable goods, such as salt, pepper, and other spices, all of which the nascent Portuguese Empire was quickly gaining access to through its widening trade network. The result of these trade relations was a mixing of Portuguese and Sapi artistic tradition, creating an Afro-Portuguese style of art. This hybridization resulted in works of art that contained symbols, motifs, and imagery derived from both the Sapi and the Portuguese.

== Sapi Civilization ==
The Sapi people belonged to a cluster of people who spoke West Atlantic languages, living along the coastal regions of modern day Sierra Leone. There had already been a carving culture established in the area prior to Portuguese contact and many travelers to Sierra Leone initially impressed with their carving skills took local Ivory horns back to Europe. Notably, Valentim Fernandes who visited the coast of Sierra Leone in the early 16th century noted that 'the ivory workers of this area were highly skilled and can also carve any work one draws'. Similarly, at the beginning of the 16th century, Pacheco noted that: 'in this country [Sierra Leone] they make beautiful mats of palm-leaf and necklaces of ivory [...]In this land they make ivory necklaces more delicately carved than in any other country, also very fine and beautiful mats of palm-leaf, which are call 'bicas' [which are] very beautiful and good. Further, accounts describe chiefs or kings wearing gold rings on their nose and ears and having elaborate hairstyles this shows a link with even further carved artefacts out of stone showing how far back this carving tradition goes.

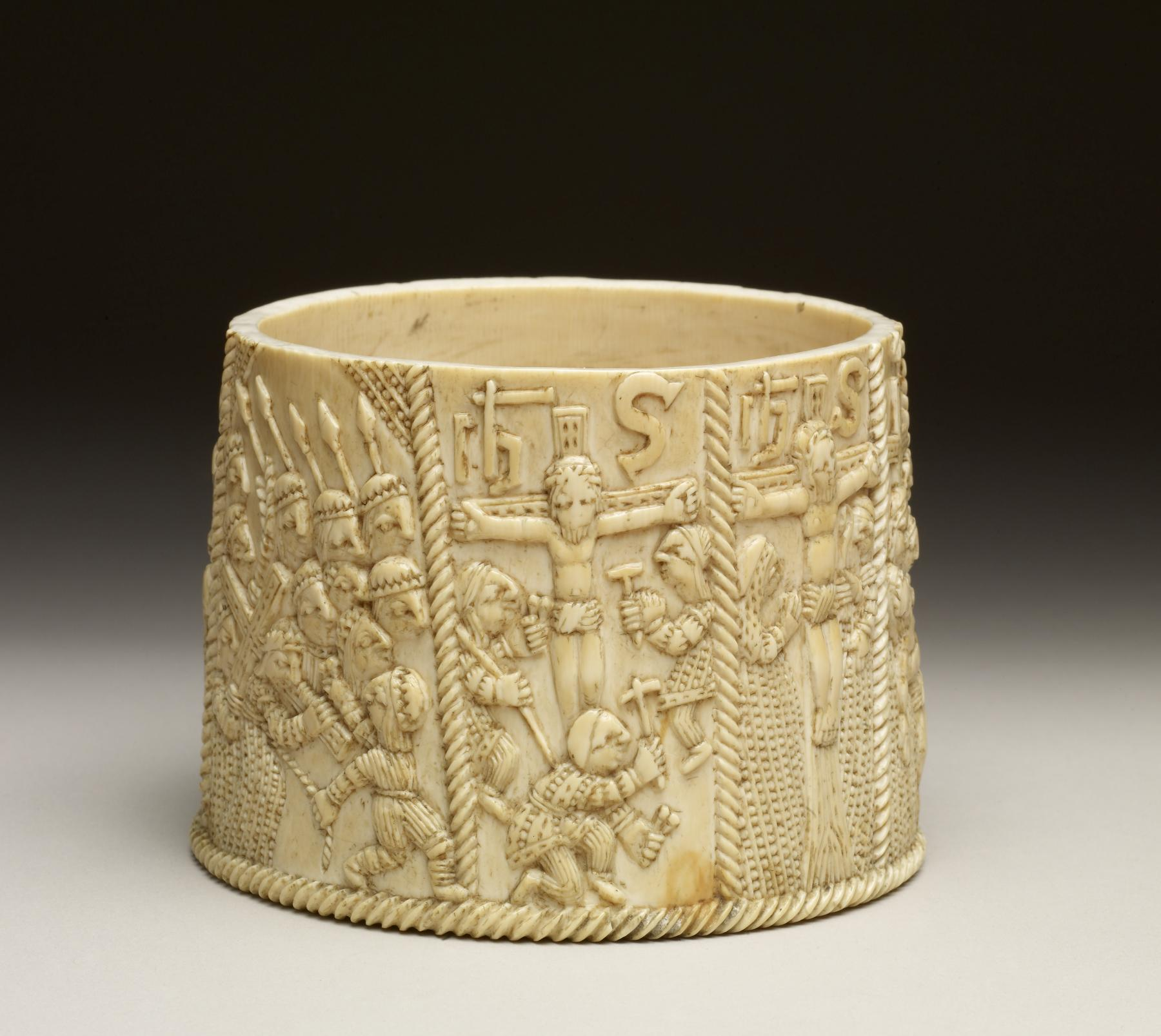
Sierra Leonean - Ivory Pyx with Scenes from the Passion of Christ, 1490-1520

The use of an indigenous Sapi patronage system was quite similar to other parts of the world, Patrons commissioned pieces often prescribing specific desires and conditions, or even bringing a model for the artist to emulate. Sapi artists, like their European counterparts, were trained through apprenticeship systems. They often spent their lives learning their trade in the workshops of masters. It is believed that there were less than forty of these workshops in both Benin Kingdom and Sierra Leone. This area stands out as an important centre of ivory carving due to the skill set of the carvers rather than just simply having a supply of ivory, ivory was an important commodity in long distance trade connecting various parts of Africa. Ivory carvers would depict local animals in their works like crocodiles, leopards, snakes, birds as well as local and foreign people.

Sapi houses were often surrounded by porches called "funcos", within the funcos of chiefs court rulings were conducted, these funcos were finely decorated with mats and had seatings the largest seat was for the chief the lower seats were for nobles. These nobles acted as councillors and it was here that parties would mediate for justice, parties would be accompanied by their advocates, called "arons", who are dressed in various costumes of feathers and bells. Both sides will make their arguments followed by the opinions of nobles and then the his Majesty gives the final sentence. Burial practice amongst the Sapi involved the dead being vuried within or near their own houses, that person would be covered with gold bracelets on their arms, and rings called macucos in their noses and ears.

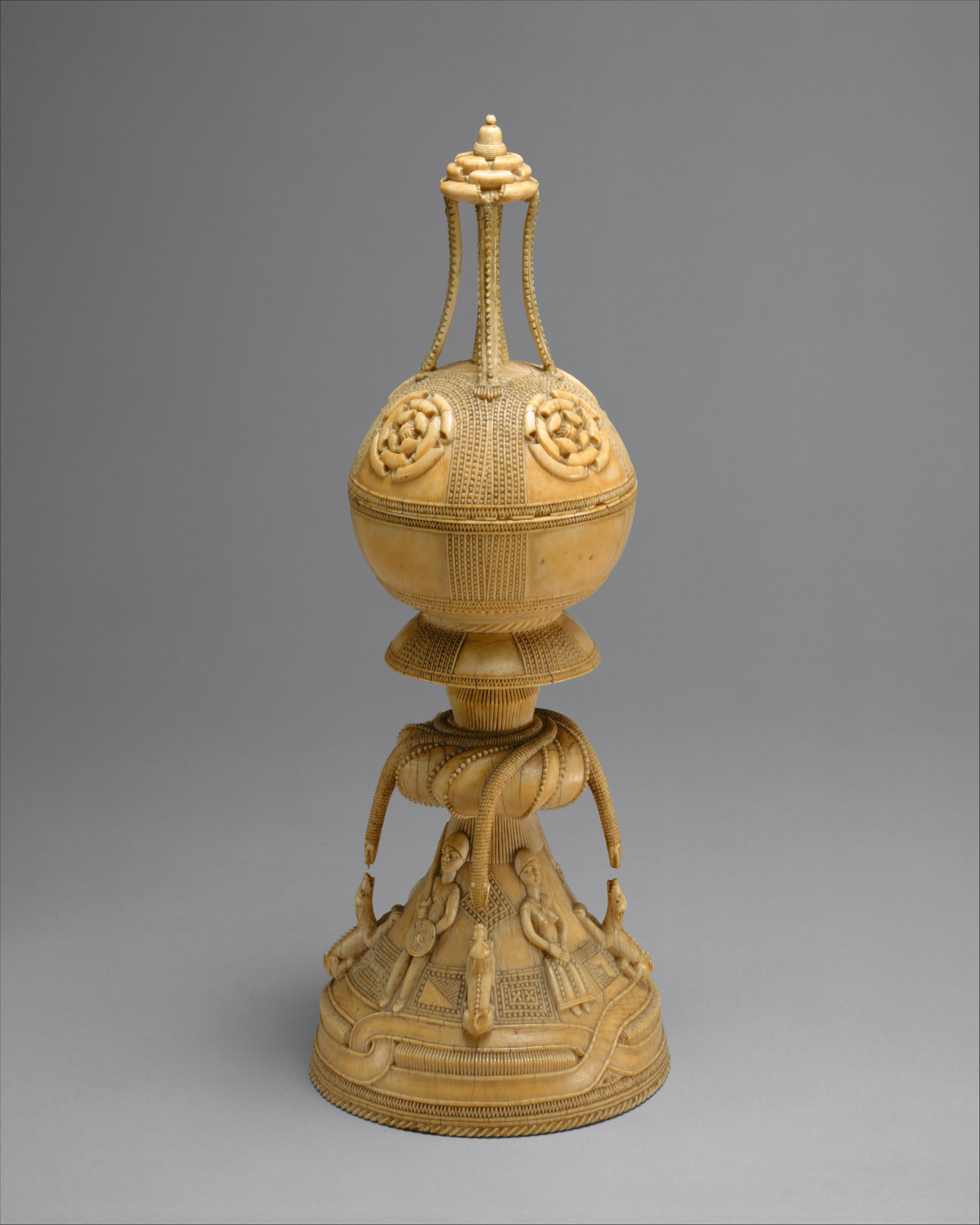
Ivory Saltceller, Sapi People, Sierra Leone

== Description ==
The lidded salt cellar dates to either the late 15th century or the 16th century. The work is made from carved ivory and bone, and was used to hold salt. Three snakes, a symbol of wealth among the Sapi, decorate the container, while four snarling dogs are seen to be confronting the snakes. Four figures wearing local attire are sculpted along the base, two are warriors holding swords and shields and two are women. Above them, curving around the disk of ivory, are four delicately carved snakes that drop down toward four dogs represented in a state of alarm with bared fangs, drawn-back ears, and bristling fur. Notably, the dogs (themselves a symbol of the spiritual world to the Sapi) are depicted with teeth bared, hair bristling, and ears laid back, according to regional traditions, dogs are considered spiritually astute animals able to see spirits and ghosts that are invisible to humans. The saltcellers made by the Sapi carvers of Sierra Leone follow two standard patterns. In one, a conical base supports a spherical lidded bowl with a handle at the top and in the other it has a spherical bowl sup- ported by figures seated on a ring-like base, their upper bodies forming a delicate openwork cage beneath the solid weight of the bowl. Both types exhibit a daring use of open space and juxtapose finely executed textured patterns and genre-like details with smooth unadorned surfaces.
