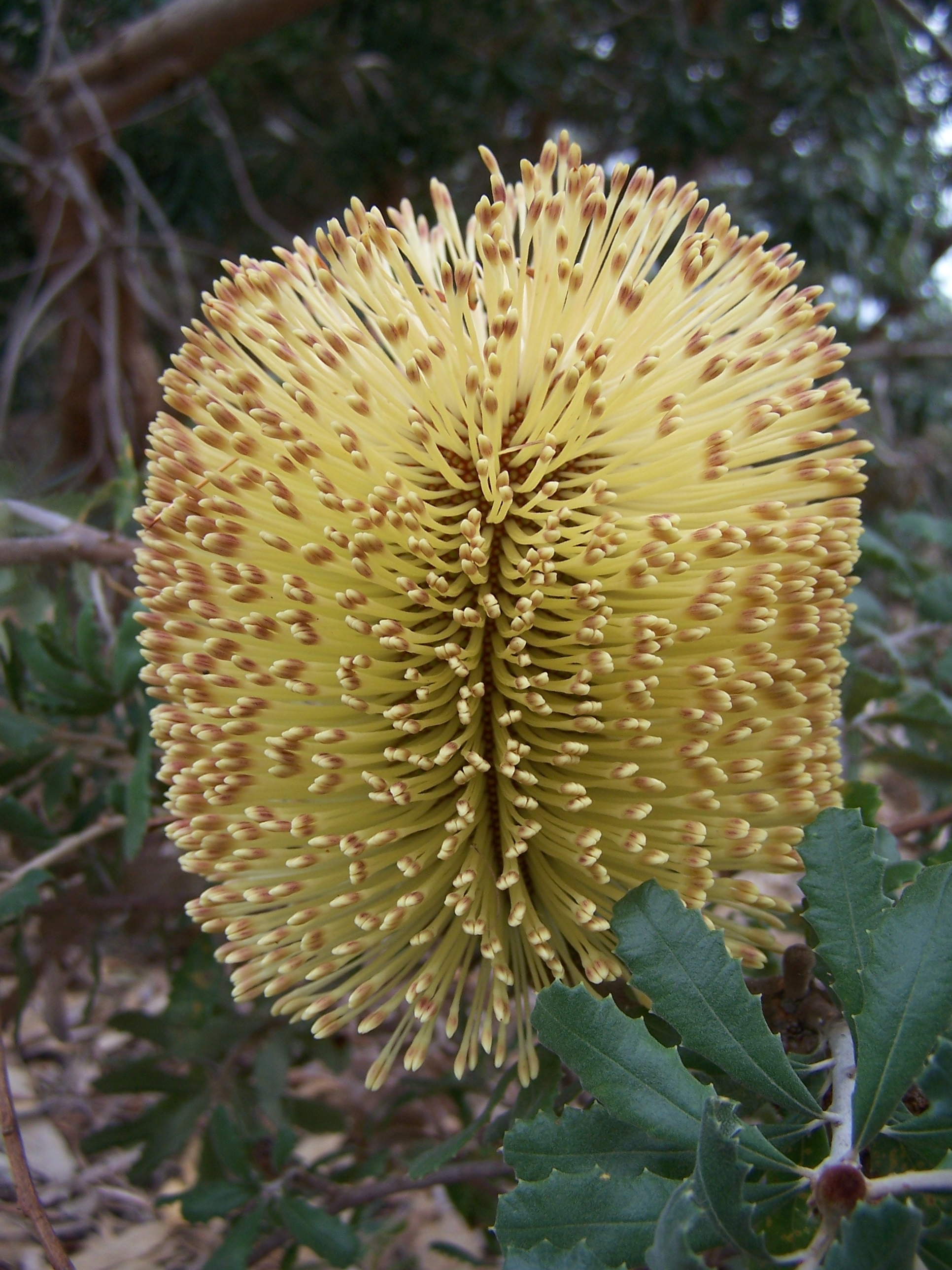
- Inflorescence

Conservation status
- Priority Two — Poorly Known Taxa (DEC)

Scientific classification
- Kingdom: Plantae
- Clade: Embryophytes
- Clade: Tracheophytes
- Clade: Spermatophytes
- Clade: Angiosperms
- Clade: Eudicots
- Order: Proteales
- Family: Proteaceae
- Genus: Banksia
- Species: B. epica

Binomial name
- Banksia epica A.S.George
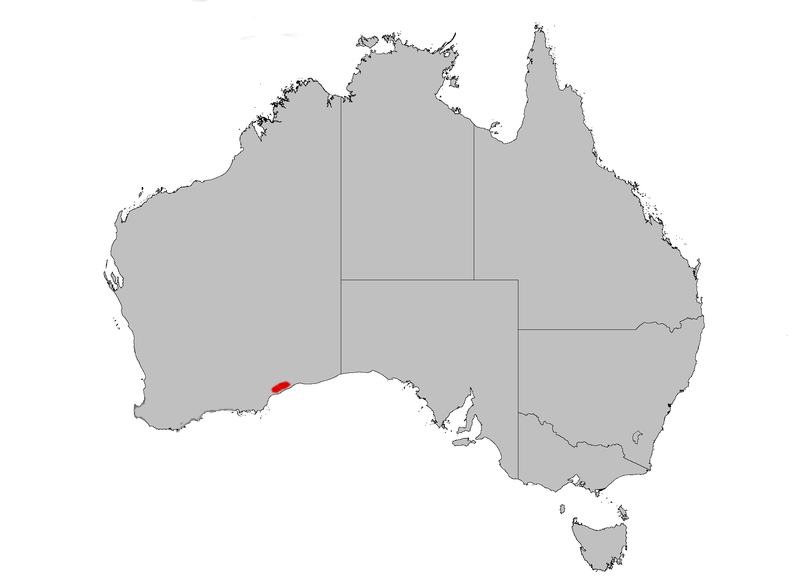
- Distribution of Banksia epica across Australia

= Banksia epica =

Species of shrub native to Western Australia

Banksia epica is a shrub that grows on the south coast of Western Australia. A spreading bush with wedge-shaped serrated leaves and large creamy-yellow flower spikes, it grows up to 3½ metres (11½ ft) high. It is known only from two isolated populations in the remote southeast of the state, near the western edge of the Great Australian Bight. Both populations occur among coastal heath on cliff-top dunes of siliceous sand.

One of the most recently described Banksia species, it was probably seen by Edward John Eyre in 1841, but was not collected until 1973, and was only recognised as a distinct species in 1988. There has been very little research on the species since then, so knowledge of its ecology and cultivation potential is limited. It is placed in Banksia ser. Cyrtostylis, alongside its close relative, the well-known and widely cultivated B. media (southern plains banksia).

== Description ==
Banksia epica grows as a spreading bushy shrub with many branches to 3 metres (9.8 feet) tall. It has grey, fissured bark, and dark green, wedge-shaped leaves, 1 1/2 to 5 centimetres (1/2–2 in) long and 6 to 15 millimetres (1/8–2/3 in) wide, with serrated margins.

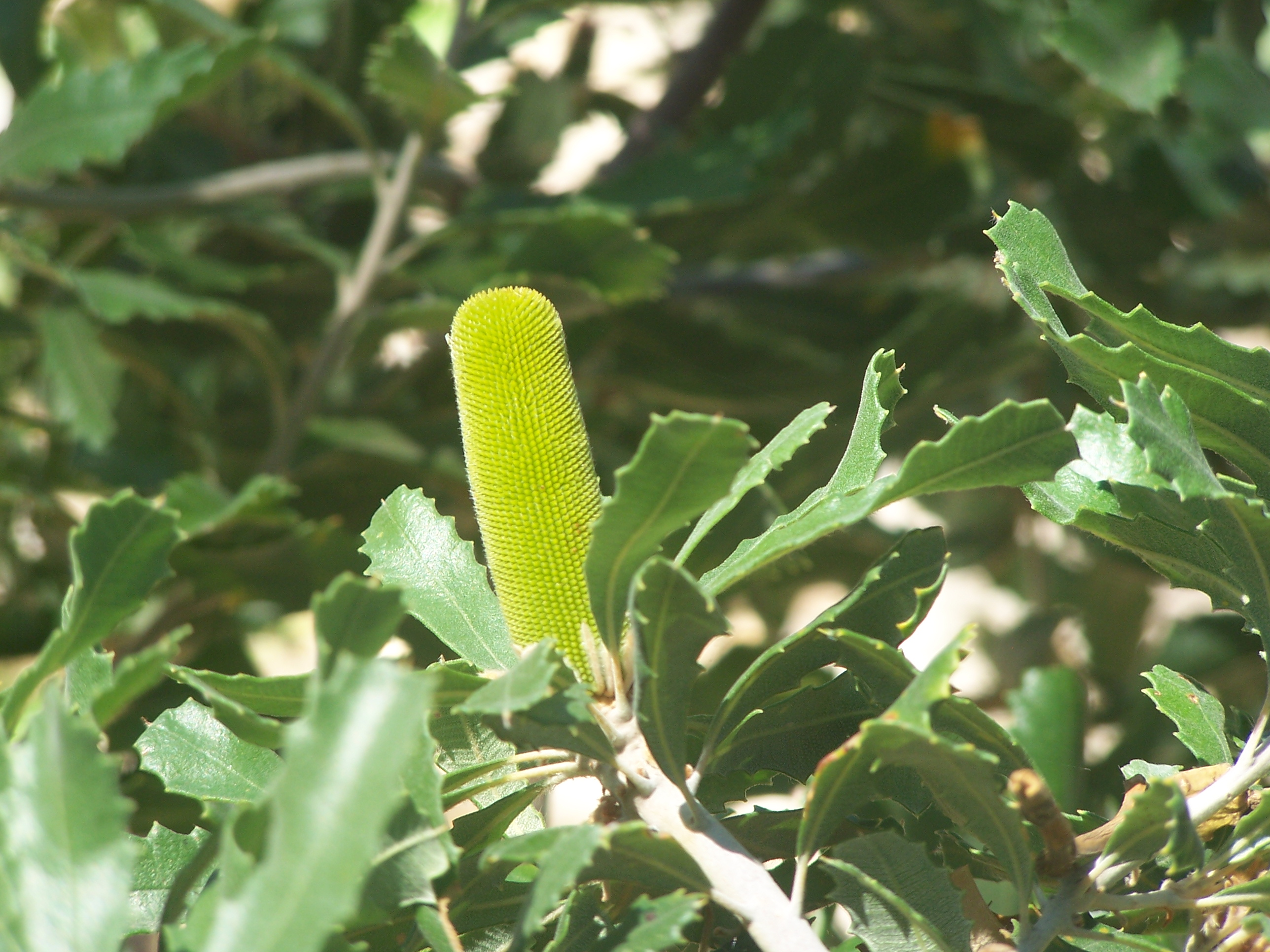
Inflorescence in early bud

Flowers occur in Banksia's characteristic "flower spike", an inflorescence made up of hundreds of pairs of flowers densely packed in a spiral round a woody axis. B. epica's flower spike is yellow or cream-yellow in colour, cylindrical, 9 to 17 centimetres (3 1/2–6 1/2 inches) tall and around 6 centimetres (2 1/2 inches) in diameter. In bud, it may have green-grey or brownish pollen presenters, not unlike B. robur (swamp banksia). Each flower consists of a tubular perianth made up of four fused tepals, and one long wiry style. Characteristic of its taxonomic section, the styles of B. epica are straight rather than hooked. The style ends are initially trapped inside the upper perianth parts, but break free at anthesis. The fruiting structure is a stout woody "cone" embedded with up to 50 follicles; old withered flower parts persist on the "cones", giving them a hairy appearance. The follicles have an attractive purple hue.

Banksia epica is similar in appearance to its close relative B. media, from which it differs in having slightly shorter leaves and larger flowers. In addition, the persistent flower parts on B. epica's fruiting structures are curled and point upwards, whereas they are straight and point downwards on B. media.

== Taxonomy ==
=== Discovery and naming ===
The first European to see B. epica was probably Edward John Eyre, the first explorer of the area, who recorded "stunted specimens" of Banksia as he was nearing the western edge of the Great Australian Bight on 1 May 1841:

"One circumstance in our route to-day cheered me greatly, and led me shortly to expect some important and decisive change in the character and formation of the country. It was the appearance for the first time of the Banksia, a shrub which I had never before found to the westward of Spencer's Gulf, but which I knew to abound in the vicinity of King George's Sound, and that description of country generally. Those only who have looked out with the eagerness and anxiety of a person in my situation, to note any change in the vegetation or physical appearance of a country, can appreciate the degree of satisfaction with which I recognised and welcomed the first appearance of the Banksia. Isolated as it was amidst the scrub, and insignificant as the stunted specimens were that I first met with, they led to an inference that I could not be mistaken in, and added, in a tenfold degree, to the interest and expectation with which every mile of our route had now become invested."

Eyre is thought to have been passing through the Toolinna Cove sand patch at the time of writing. B. epica and B. media are the only Banksia species that occur at that location, and both have a form and habit that accords with Eyre's description. As he did not collect specimens, it is impossible to determine what species he saw.

The first herbarium collection of B. epica was not made until October 1973, when Ernest Charles Nelson visited Toolinna Cove to collect specimens for a taxonomic revision of Adenanthos. Nelson was stimulated to make that revision from an interest in the problem of disjunct plant distributions in southern Australia, and therefore collected specimens of a range of plant species. On 22 October, he collected a specimen of B. epica in old flower, but incorrectly identified it as B. media, and later lodged it in the herbarium at Canberra under that name.

In 1985, two volunteer field collectors for The Banksia Atlas project, John and Lalage Falconer of Esperance, became convinced that there were three Banksia species rather than two at Point Culver. Returning to the locality on 9 January 1986, they collected leaves and old flowers of what they thought was an undescribed species. The specimens did indeed suggest that a new species had been discovered, but they were not sufficient for formal publication. Early in May the following year, John Falconer drove over 2000 kilometres on unsealed tracks from Warburton to Point Culver and back again, to collect fresh flowers and fruit of the purported new species. Alex George then began preparing a formal description of the species. During his research, he discovered that Nelson's Toolinna Cove specimen was also referable to the undescribed species. In the absence of any genuine B. media specimens from Toolinna Cove, George inferred that only B. epica occurred there, and that Eyre must have sighted B. epica in 1841. In 1988, he published a formal description of the species, naming it Banksia epica in reference to the two "epic" journeys of Eyre and Falconer. Thus the species' full name is Banksia epica A.S.George. It was later established that both B. epica and B. media occur at Toolinna Cove.

=== Infrageneric placement ===
George placed B. epica in B. subg. Banksia, because its inflorescences are typical Banksia flower spikes; B. sect. Banksia because of its straight styles; and B. ser. Cyrtostylis because it has slender flowers. He considered its closest relatives to be B. praemorsa (cut-leaf banksia) and B. media, both of which have shorter flowers and smaller pollen-presenters than B. epica. In addition, B. praemorsa differs in having a hairless perianth, and B. media has larger, more undulate leaves.

In 1996, Kevin Thiele and Pauline Ladiges published the results of a cladistic analysis of morphological characters of Banksia. They retained George's subgenera and many of his series, but discarded his sections. George's B. ser. Cyrtostylis was found to be "widely polyphyletic", as six of the fourteen taxa in that series occurred singly in locations throughout Thiele and Ladiges' cladogram. The remaining eight formed a clade that further resolved into two subclades, with B. epica appeared in one of them:

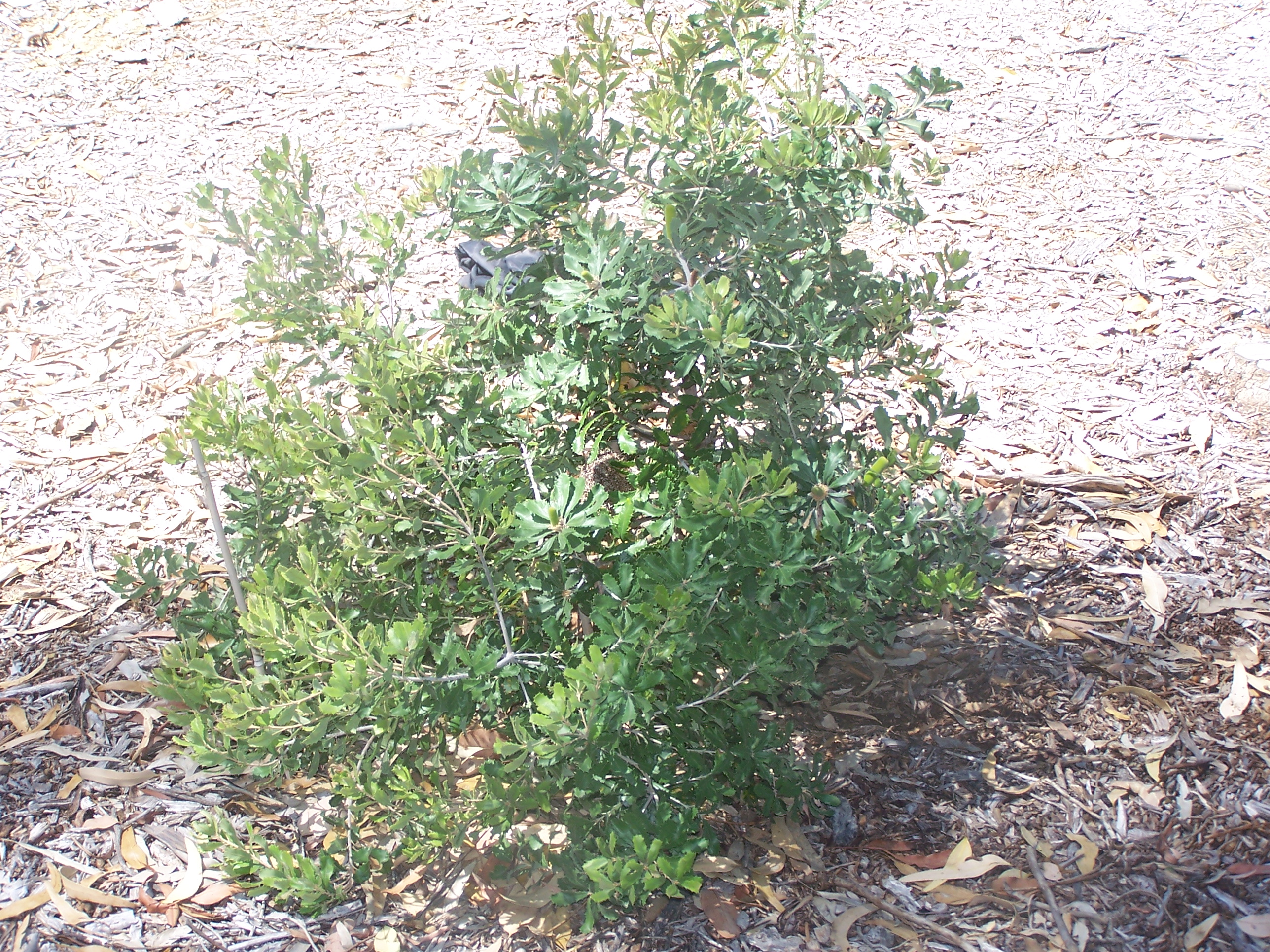
Shrub in Kings Park, Western Australia

- - B. pilostylis
  - - B. media
    - B. epica
    - B. praemorsa
- - B. benthamiana
  - B. audax
  - - B. laevigata subsp. laevigata
    - B. laevigata subsp. fuscolutea

Thiele and Ladiges preferred to give series rank to the subclades, rather than the entire clade, so they transferred the taxa of the second clade into B. ser. Ochraceae, retaining only the taxa of the first clade in B. ser. Cyrtostylis. B. epica's placement under Thiele and Ladiges' arrangement may be summarised as follows:

Banksia

B. subg. Isostylis (3 species)
B. elegans (incertae sedis)
B. subg. Banksia

B. ser. Tetragonae (4 species)
B. ser. Lindleyanae (1 species)
B. ser. Banksia (2 subseries, 12 species)
B. baueri (incertae sedis)
B. lullfitzii (incertae sedis)
B. attenuata (incertae sedis)
B. ashbyi (incertae sedis)
B. coccinea (incertae sedis)
B. ser. Prostratae (8 species)
B. ser. Cyrtostylis

B. pilostylis
B. media
B. epica
B. praemorsa

B. ser. Ochraceae (3 species, 2 subspecies)
B. ser. Grandes (2 species)
B. ser. Salicinae (2 series, 11 species, 4 subspecies)
B. ser. Spicigerae (3 series, 7 species, 6 varieties)
B. ser. Quercinae (2 species)
B. ser. Dryandroideae (1 species)
B. ser. Abietinae (4 subseries, 15 species, 8 varieties)

The arrangement of Thiele and Ladiges was not accepted by George, and was discarded in his 1999 revision. Under George's 1999 arrangement, B. epica's placement was as follows:

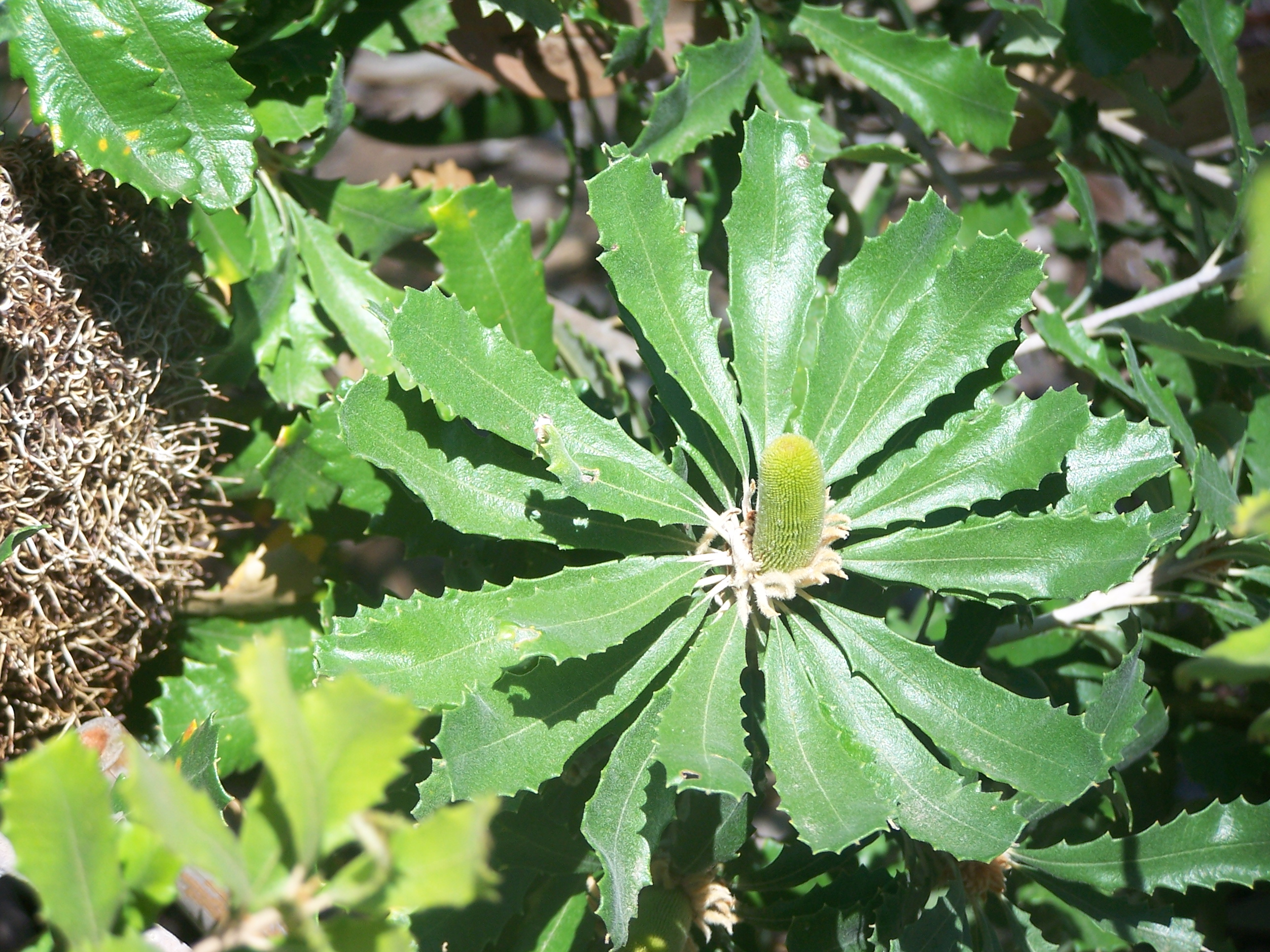
Closeup of leaves, with inflorescence in early bud

Banksia

B. subg. Banksia

B. sect. Banksia

B. ser. Salicinae (11 species, 7 subspecies)
B. ser. Grandes (2 species)
B. ser. Banksia (8 species)
B. ser. Crocinae (4 species)
B. ser. Prostratae (6 species, 3 varieties)
B. ser. Cyrtostylis

B. media
B. praemorsa
B. epica
B. pilostylis
B. attenuata
B. ashbyi
B. benthamiana
B. audax
B. lullfitzii
B. elderiana
B. laevigata (2 subspecies)
B. elegans
B. lindleyana

B. ser. Tetragonae (3 species)
B. ser. Bauerinae (1 species)
B. ser. Quercinae (2 species)

B. sect. Coccinea (1 species)
B. sect. Oncostylis (4 series, 22 species, 4 subspecies, 11 varieties)

B. subg. Isostylis (3 species)

Since 1998, Austin Mast has been publishing results of ongoing cladistic analyses of DNA sequence data for the subtribe Banksiinae. His analyses suggest a phylogeny that is rather different from previous taxonomic arrangements. With respect to B. epica, however, Mast's results accord closely with the arrangement of Thiele and Ladiges, placing it in a polytomous clade corresponding exactly with Thiele and Ladiges' B. ser. Cyrtostylis.

Early in 2007 Mast and Thiele initiated a rearrangement by transferring Dryandra to Banksia, and publishing B. subg. Spathulatae for the species having spoon-shaped cotyledons; in this way they also redefined the autonym B. subg. Banksia. They foreshadowed publishing a full arrangement once DNA sampling of Dryandra was complete; in the meantime, if Mast and Thiele's nomenclatural changes are taken as an interim arrangement, then B. epica is placed in B. subg. Banksia.

== Distribution and habitat ==
Banksia epica is known only from two populations in eastern parts of the Esperance Plains region of the South West Botanical Province, near the western edge of the Great Australian Bight. The main population occurs about 30 kilometres (19 miles) west of Point Culver; there were over 2000 plants there when surveyed in June 1989. A smaller population occurs about 70 kilometres (43 miles) further east at Toolinna Cove; when surveyed in August 1991, this locality had around 350 plants. This latter population represents the easternmost limit of the western Banksia species; east of Toolinna Cove no Banksia species occurs for over 900 kilometres (560 miles).

In both localities, B. epica occurs among heath on cliff-top dunes of deep, white siliceous sand over limestone. It co-occurs with B. media in both localities, and B. praemorsa is also present at Point Culver. Toolinna Cove sand is somewhat alkaline, making B. epica and B. media the only Banksia species that grow in alkaline soil.

These two localities are unusual in having cliff-top dunes of siliceous sand: cliff-top dunes are an unusual topographic formation, and nearly all soil in the area is calcareous. As Banksia species are intolerant of calcareous soils, and are not adapted to long range seed dispersal, the two populations of B. epica appear to be reproductively isolated. Nelson has suggested that there was once a continuous strip of siliceous sand along the coast, providing an extensive and unfragmented habitat for B. epica; rises in the sea level had submerged this strip, leaving only the cliff-top dunes as suitable habitat. The fact that the resultant isolated populations have not perceptibly speciated since then suggests that the species has been fragmented for only a short time, perhaps only since the Last Glacial Maximum.

== Ecology ==
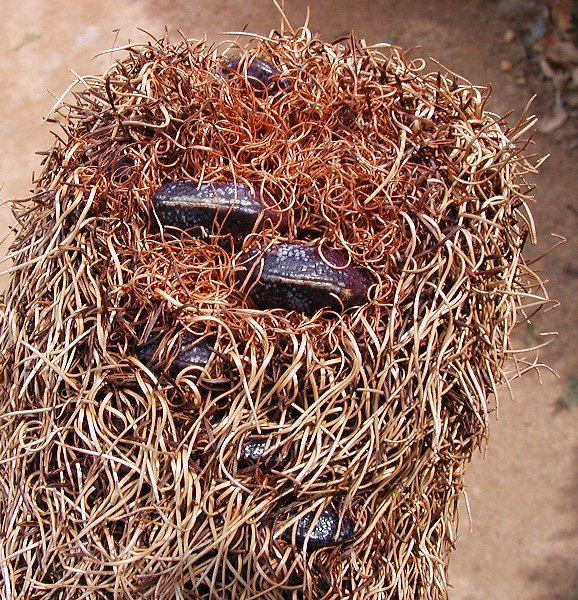
Old cone with purple follicles

Pollinators of B. epica include Phylidonyris novaehollandiae (New Holland honeyeater) and Acanthiza chrysorrhoa (yellow-rumped thornbill). No other pollinators have been recorded, but the species is poorly surveyed, and studies of other Banksia species have consistently indicated a wide range of invertebrate and vertebrate pollinators. For example, a survey of the closely related and co-occurring B. media found that "honeyeater birds and marsupial nectarivores were abundant in the study area and most carried the pollen of Banksia media while it flowered.… Self-pollination and pollination by insects clearly also play major roles in seed production."

Like most other Proteaceae, B. epica has proteoid roots, roots with dense clusters of short lateral rootlets that form a mat in the soil just below the leaf litter. These enhance solubilisation of nutrients, allowing nutrient uptake in low-nutrient soils such as the phosphorus-deficient native soils of Australia. The species lacks a lignotuber, so is thought to be killed by fire. Like most Banksia species, however, it is adapted to release its aerial seed bank following a bushfire, so populations regenerate rapidly. It is highly susceptible to Phytophthora cinnamomi dieback.

Because so few populations are known, B. epica has been listed on the Department of Environment and Conservation's Declared Rare and Priority Flora List as "Priority Two – Poorly Known Taxa""; and as 2RC under the ROTAP system (rare but not currently endangered or vulnerable, and having a range less than 100 km). It is not considered to be under threat, however, because both known populations occur within the Nuytsland Nature Reserve, and are undisturbed and healthy. Furthermore, the area in which it occurs is poorly surveyed, so it is possible that other populations exist.

== Cultivation ==
B. epica is fairly new to cultivation. Kevin Collins of the Banksia Farm in Albany, Western Australia is said to have pioneered its cultivation, growing it in loamy clay or sandy gravel. It showed good tolerance for alkaline soils in those conditions, and has also succeeded in sandy, alkaline soil near the coast between Mandurah and Kwinana. The Australian National Botanic Gardens in Canberra has also had some success in cultivating the species. Seeds were sown in February 1996, and planted out in November 1997; seedlings planted into sections without good drainage died, but two seedlings that were planted into a section with excellent drainage were about a metre tall by 2002, and flowering prolifically.

Propagation is by seed or cuttings. Seeds do not require any treatment, and take 14 to 49 days to germinate. In the absence of further information specific to B. epica, George recommends that cultivated plants be treated as for B. media and B. praemorsa, both of which require a sunny position in well-drained soil, and tolerate only light pruning not below the green foliage.
