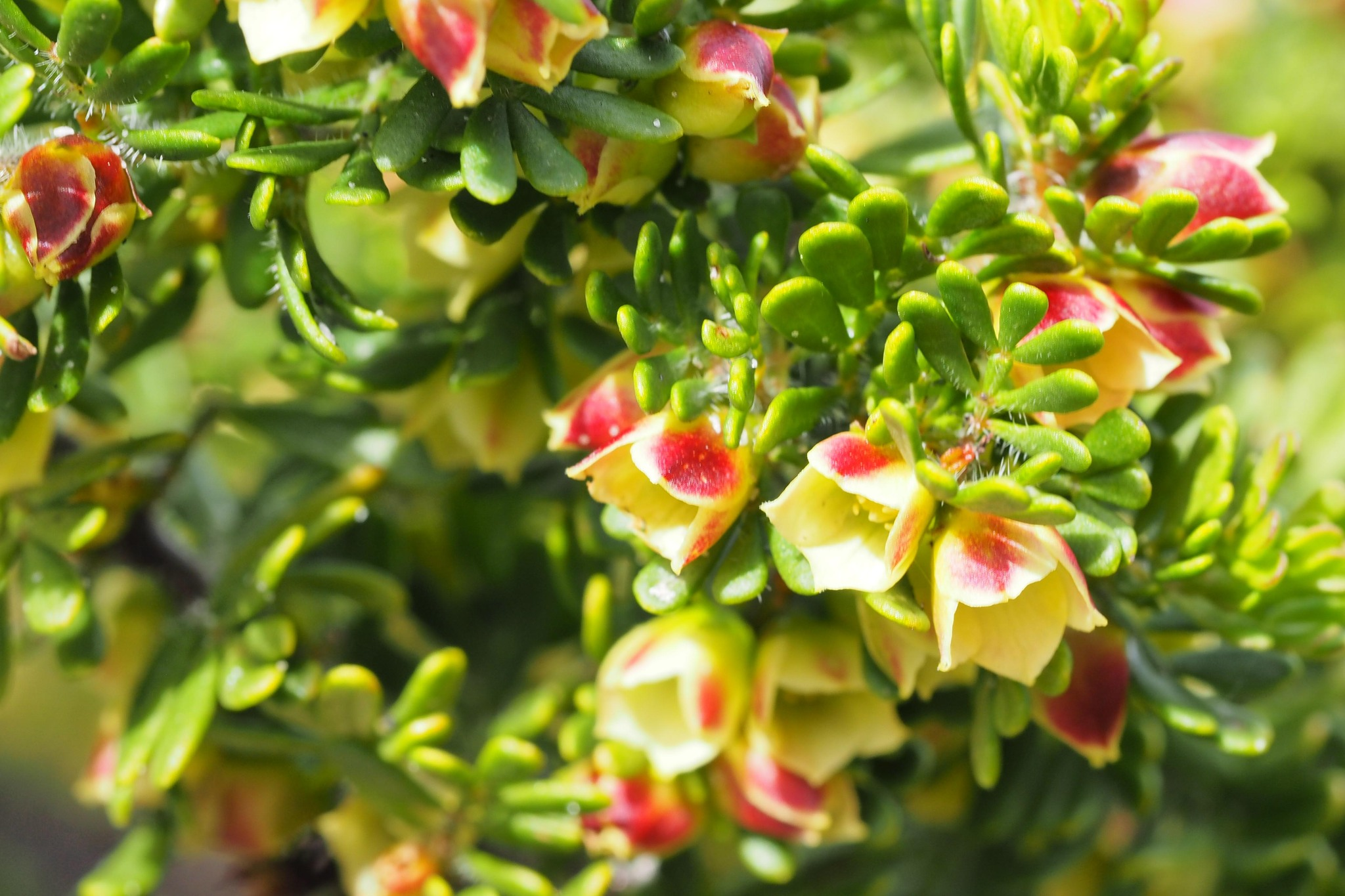
- Near Hammersley Inlet

Scientific classification
- Kingdom: Plantae
- Clade: Tracheophytes
- Clade: Angiosperms
- Clade: Eudicots
- Clade: Rosids
- Order: Sapindales
- Family: Rutaceae
- Genus: Boronia
- Species: B. crassifolia

Binomial name
- Boronia crassifolia Bartl.
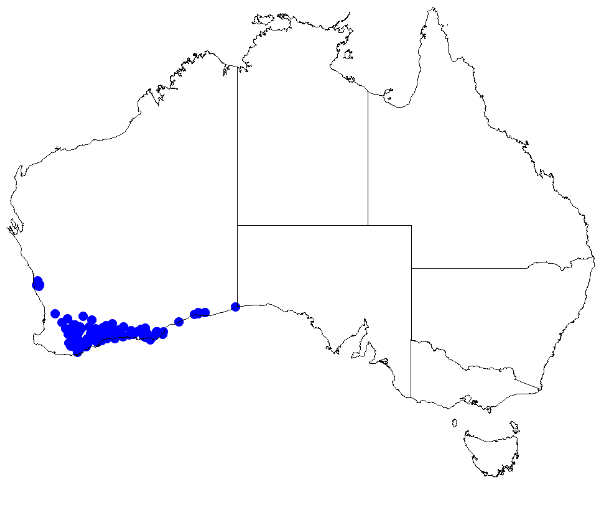
- Occurrence data from Australasian Virtual Herbarium

= Boronia crassifolia =

Species of flowering plant

Boronia crassifolia is a plant in the citrus family Rutaceae and is endemic to the south-west of Western Australia. It is a small, slender shrub with pinnate leaves, and yellowish green to brownish, four petalled flowers.

== Description ==
Boronia crassifolia is a slender, rounded shrub that grows to a height of about 30 cm (10 in). It has pinnate leaves with three, five, or seven linear- to spatula-shaped leaflets 5–10 mm (0.2–0.4 in). The flowers are yellowish-green to brownish, about 10 mm (0.4 in) in diameter and hang from the leaf axils on a pedicel 3–5 mm (0.1–0.2 in) long. The four sepals are red, more or less round and about 2.5 mm (0.1 in) long. The four petals are about 4 mm (0.2 in) long. The eight stamens alternate in length, with the four near the petals longer than those near the sepals.

== Taxonomy and naming ==
Boronia crassifolia was first formally described in 1845 by Friedrich Gottlieb Bartling and the description was published in Plantae Preissianae. The specific epithet (crassifolia) is derived from the Latin words crassus meaning "thick", "fat" or "stout" and folium meaning "a leaf".

== Distribution and habitat ==
Boronia crassifolia grows on sandplains and sand dunes, often among rocks near Mount Lesueur and from near Perth to the Stirling Range and east to the Twilight Cove, in the Avon Wheatbelt, Esperance Plains, Geraldton Sandplains, Hampton, Jarrah Forest and Mallee biogeographic regions.
