= Roe Plains =

Plain in southeast of Western Australia

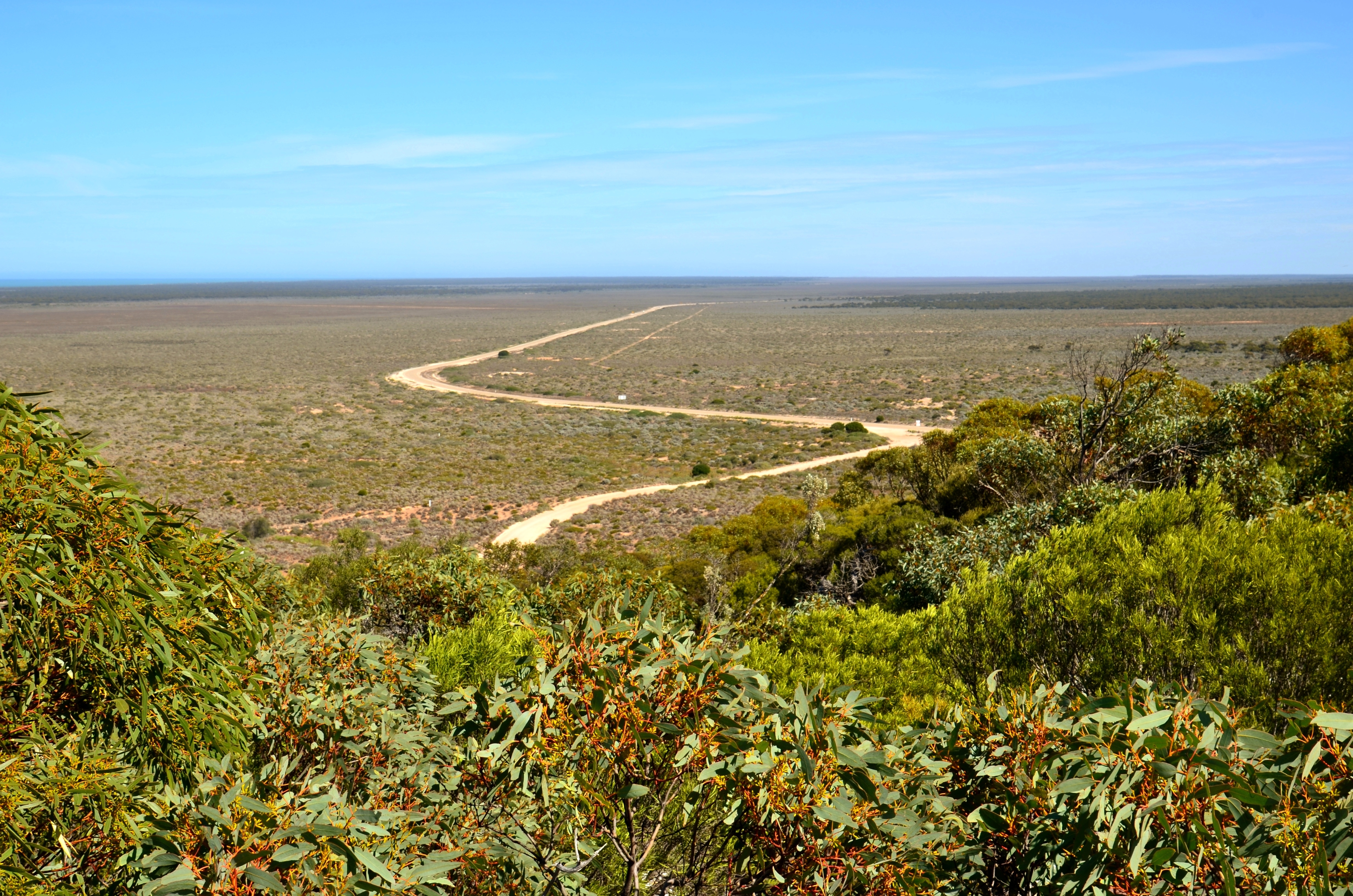
View of the Roe Plains from Eucla, Western Australia

The Roe Plains is a coastal plain in the southeastern corner of Western Australia.

The Roe Plains are predominantly marine dunes on a coastal plain. The plains are bounded on the south by the Great Australian Bight. They are bounded on the west by the Baxter Cliffs, which extend for nearly 200 km along the shore of the bight, and on the east by the Bunda Cliffs, which extend eastwards from near Eucla for 220 km along the coast of South Australia.

The plains are bounded on the north by the Hampton Tableland, an escarpment which rises to the Nullarbor Plain, and which is a continuation of the Baxter and Bunda cliffs.

The Eyre Highway traverses the Roe Plains between the Madura Pass on the west and the Eucla Pass on the east.

The only current human settlements on the Roe Plains are Madura and Mundrabilla roadhouses and the nearby stations — Madura Station and Mundrabilla Station. The Roe Plains extend further west than Madura Pass to Twilight Cove, roughly south of Cocklebiddy on the Eyre Highway and Nullarbor Plain.

The Roe Plains constitute most of the Hampton bioregion, and include areas of coastal scrub, mallee woodland, and tall eucalypt woodlands near the base of the Hampton escarpment. The western portion of the plains is in Nuytsland Nature Reserve. Eyre Bird Observatory is located in the nature reserve, near the western end of the plains.

The plains are considered geologically to be late Neogene. Similar to the caves of the Hampton Tableland, the Roe Plains have a resource of fossil deposits.
