= List of State Register of Heritage Places in the Shire of Dundas =

The State Register of Heritage Places is maintained by the Heritage Council of Western Australia. As of 2026, 78 places are heritage-listed in the Shire of Dundas, of which seven are on the State Register of Heritage Places.

== List ==
The Western Australian State Register of Heritage Places, as of 2026, lists the following seven state registered places within the Shire of Dundas:

Place name	Place #	Street number	Street name	Suburb or town	Co-ordinates	Notes & former names	Photo
Balladonia Telegraph Station	761		Eyre Highway	Balladonia	32.464475°S 123.862242°E	Eyre Telegraph Station	
Holy Trinity Church, Norseman	762	100	Angove Street	Norseman	32.200045°S 121.77777°E		
Norseman Post Office	767	82	Prinsep Street	Norseman	32.19805°S 121.779317°E		
Eucla Telegraph Station	3558			Eucla	31.714066°S 128.886454°E		
Eucla Jetty (Ruins), Abutment & Beach Landing (Remains)	4222		on the beach 5 km south of Eucla	Eucla	31.722711°S 128.887127°E		
Doctor's House (former), Norseman	10120	66	Talbot Street	Norseman	32.198865°S 121.770729°E	Destroyed by fire in July 2008 and demolished in 2009	
Eyre Bird Observatory	16522		45 km SE of Cocklebiddy Roadhouse	Cocklebiddy	32.246389°S 126.3016677°E	Eyre Telegraph Station, Eyres Sand Patch Telegraph Station	
