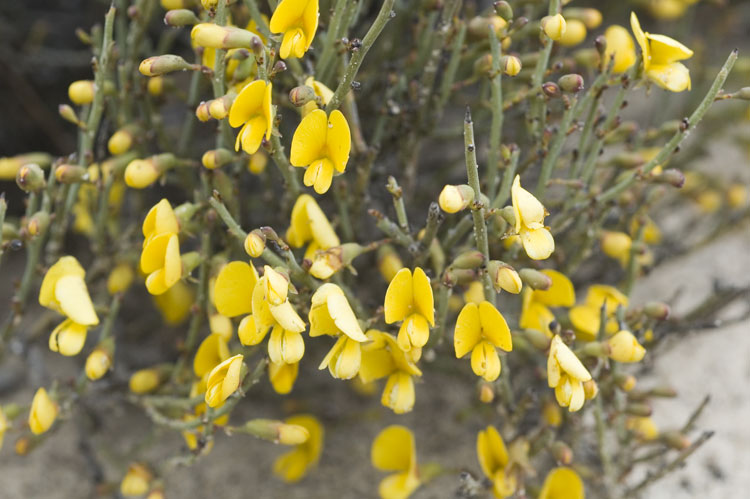
- Near Madura Pass in Nuytsland Nature Reserve

Scientific classification
- Kingdom: Plantae
- Clade: Tracheophytes
- Clade: Angiosperms
- Clade: Eudicots
- Clade: Rosids
- Order: Fabales
- Family: Fabaceae
- Subfamily: Faboideae
- Genus: Bossiaea
- Species: B. leptacantha

Binomial name
- Bossiaea leptacantha E.Pritz.
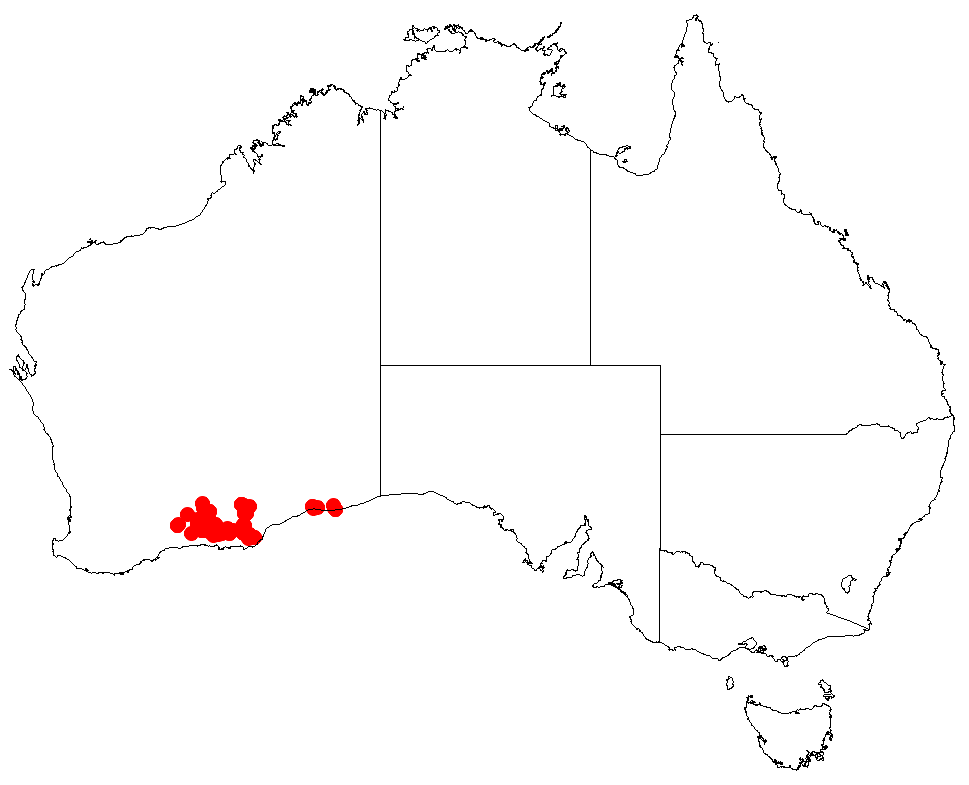
- Occurrence data from AVH

= Bossiaea leptacantha =

Species of legume

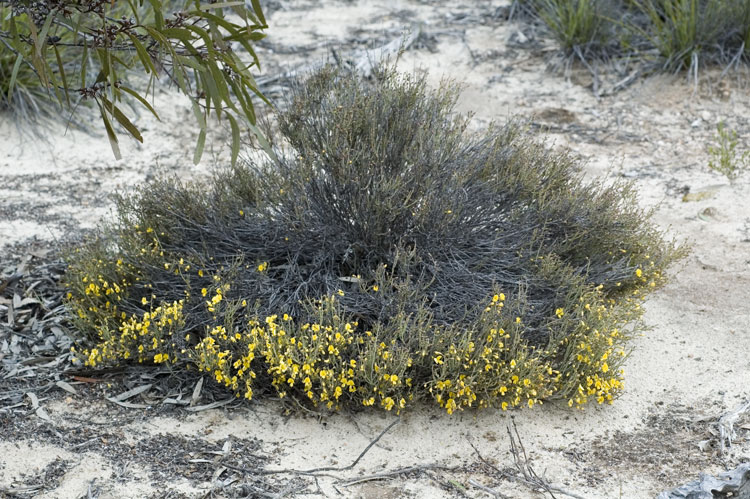
Habit

Bossiaea leptacantha is a species of flowering plant in the family Fabaceae and is endemic to southern Western Australia. It is a low, compact, spreading, many-branched shrub, the branches ending in cladodes, the leaves reduced to small scales, and with deep yellow, red and greenish yellow flowers.

== Description ==
Bossiaea leptacantha is a low, compact, spreading, many-branched shrub that typically grows up to 50 cm (20 in) high, 1 m (3 ft 3 in) wide and is glabrous except for the youngest growth. The branches end in cladodes 1.0–1.5 mm (0.039–0.059 in) wide, the leaves reduced to dark brown scales 0.7–1.0 mm (0.028–0.039 in) long. The flowers are usually arranged singly, each flower on a pedicel up to 7.5 mm (0.30 in) long with up to thirteen overlapping bracts up to 1 mm (0.039 in) long. The five sepals are joined at the base forming a tube 3–3.5 mm (0.12–0.14 in) long, the two upper lobes 10.5–14.4 mm (0.41–0.57 in) long and the three lower lobes 1.8–3.5 mm (0.071–0.138 in) long, with egg-shaped bracteoles 0.8–1.5 mm (0.031–0.059 in) long on the pedicel. The standard petal is deep yellow with a red base and 7.7–9.4 mm (0.30–0.37 in) long, the wings deep yellow and 6.5–8.5 mm (0.26–0.33 in) long, and the keel is greenish yellow and 6.5–8.2 mm (0.26–0.32 in) long. Flowering occurs from July to December and the fruit is an oblong pod 15–24 mm (0.59–0.94 in) long.

== Taxonomy and naming ==
Bossiaea leptacantha was first formally described in 1904 by Ernst Georg Pritzel in the Botanische Jahrbücher für Systematik, Pflanzengeschichte und Pflanzengeographie. The specific epithet (leptacantha) means "thin and prickly", referring to the branchlets.

== Distribution and habitat ==
This bossiaea grows in sand on dunes and undulating plains from near Peak Charles to Madura in the Coolgardie, Hampton and Mallee biogeographic regions of southern Western Australia.

== Conservation status ==
Bossiaea leptacantha is classified as "not threatened" by the Government of Western Australia Department of Parks and Wildlife.
