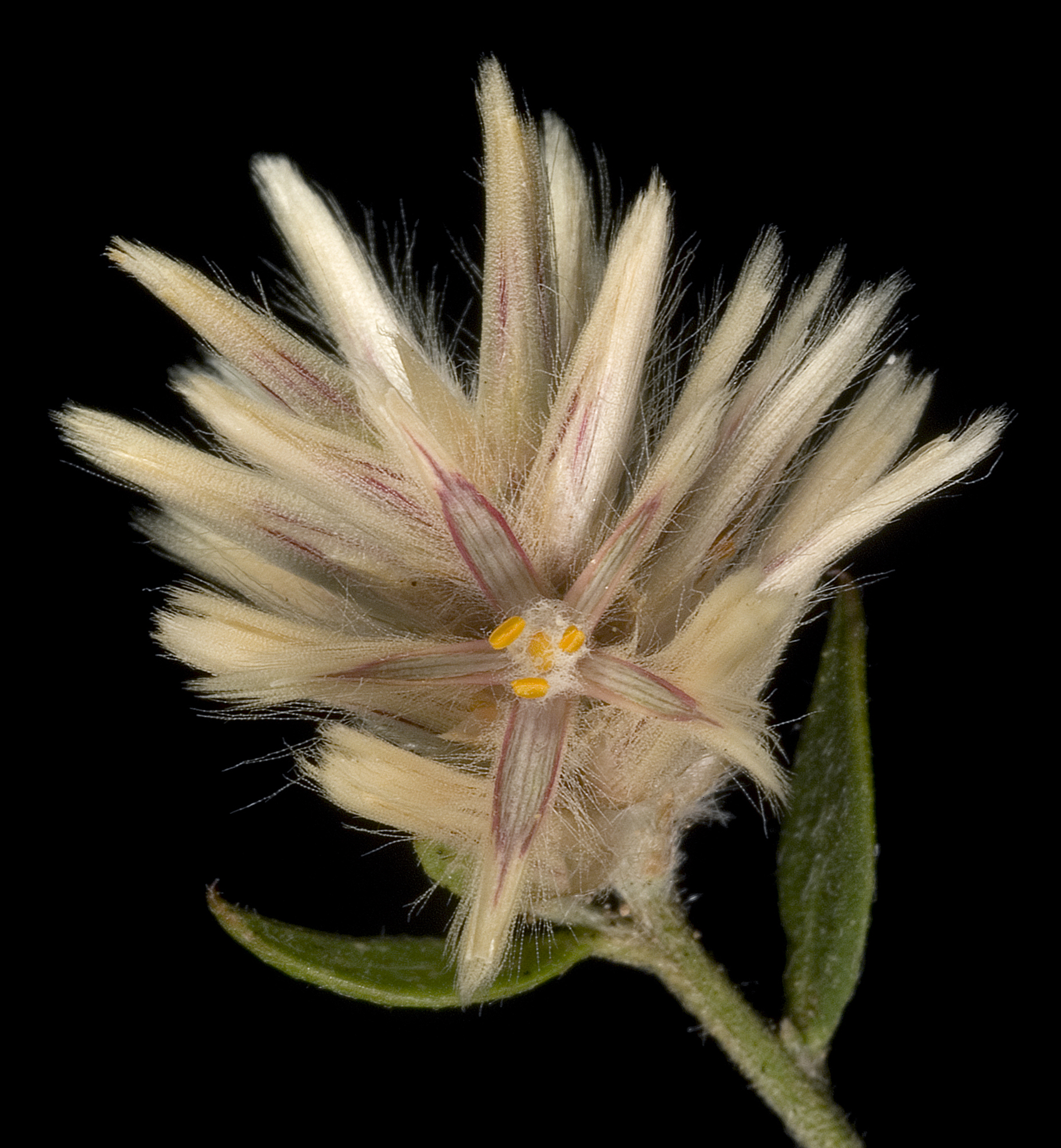

Scientific classification
- Kingdom: Plantae
- Clade: Embryophytes
- Clade: Tracheophytes
- Clade: Spermatophytes
- Clade: Angiosperms
- Clade: Eudicots
- Order: Caryophyllales
- Family: Amaranthaceae
- Genus: Ptilotus
- Species: P. symonii

Binomial name
- Ptilotus symonii Benl

= Ptilotus symonii =

Species of plant

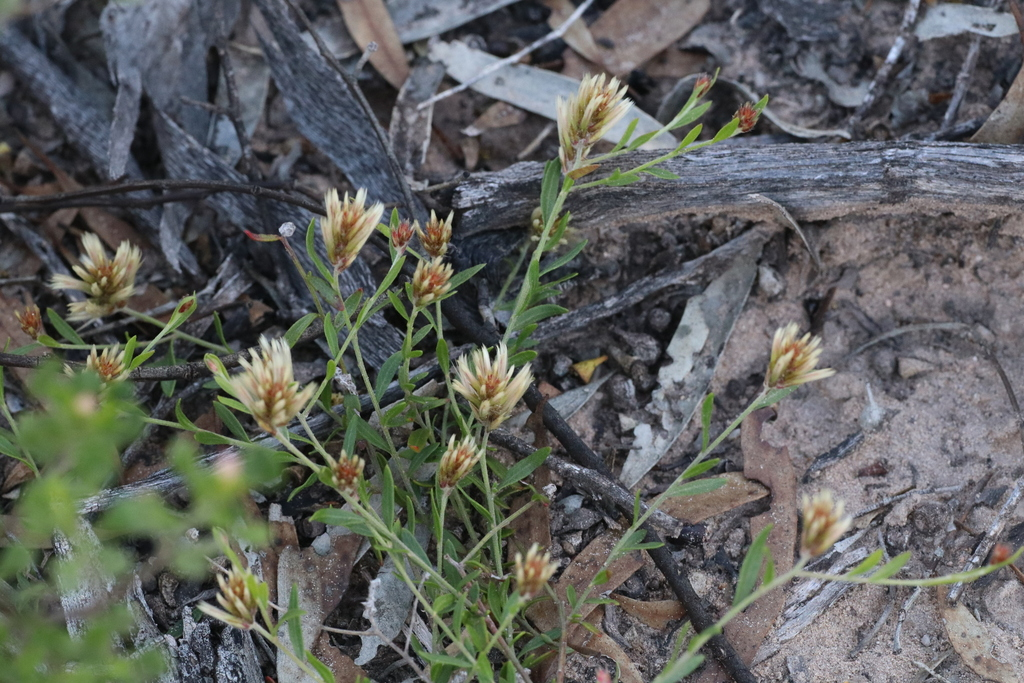
Habit near Cocklebiddy

Ptilotus symonii, commonly known as Symon's mulla mulla, is a species of flowering plant of the family Amaranthaceae and is endemic to the south-western coast of mainland Australia. It is a low-lying or ascending perennial herb with hairy stems, at least at first, narrowly elliptic or egg-shaped stem leaves and spherical or hemispherical spikes of cream-coloured or green flowers.

== Description ==
Ptilotus symonii is a low-lying or ascending perennial herb that typically grows to a 50 cm (20 in) high and wide, its stems hairy, becoming glabrous with age. There are no leaves at the base of the plant. The stem leaves are arranged alternately, narrowly elliptic or egg-shaped, up to 20 mm (0.79 in) long and 5 mm (0.20 in) wide. The flowers are borne in a spherical or hemispherical spike up to 25 mm (0.98 in) long with about 30 flowers. The bracts are 4.5–4.8 mm (0.18–0.19 in) long and the bracteoles 7–8 mm (0.28–0.31 in) long, both with an obscure midrib. The outer tepals 11.0–11.4 mm (0.43–0.45 in) long, and the inner tepals 9.0–9.3 mm (0.35–0.37 in) long and there are three fertile stamens and two staminodes. The style is 1.2–1.5 mm (0.047–0.059 in) long and fixed to the side of the glabrous ovary. Flowering mainly occurs from September to November.

== Taxonomy ==
Ptilotus symonii was first formally described in 1968 by Gerhard Benl in the Transactions of the Royal Society of South Australia from specimens collected 5 mi (8.0 km) south of Koonalda homestead, east of Eucla by David Eric Symon (1920 - 2011) in 1967. The specific epithet (symonii) honours David E. Symon, botanist at the Waite Agricultural Research Institute, and who was one of the collectors of the new species.

== Distribution and habitat ==
This species of Ptilotus grows in sandy soil on limestone plains, floodplains and low, rocky roses in woodland or in open mallee scrub in the Coolgardie, Hampton, Mallee and Nullarbor bioregions of southern Western Australia and South Australia.

== Conservation status ==
Ptilotus symonii is listed as 'not threatened' by the Government of Western Australia Department of Biodiversity, Conservation and Attractions.
