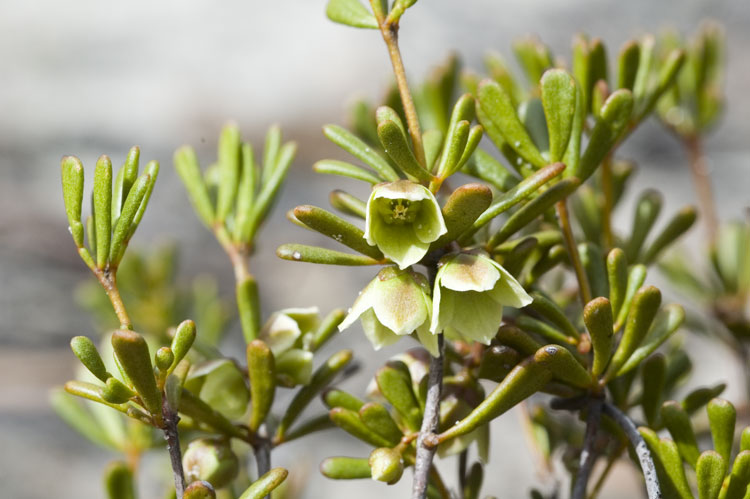
- Boronia octandra in the Nuytsland Nature Reserve

Scientific classification
- Kingdom: Plantae
- Clade: Tracheophytes
- Clade: Angiosperms
- Clade: Eudicots
- Clade: Rosids
- Order: Sapindales
- Family: Rutaceae
- Genus: Boronia
- Species: B. octandra

Binomial name
- Boronia octandra Paul G.Wilson
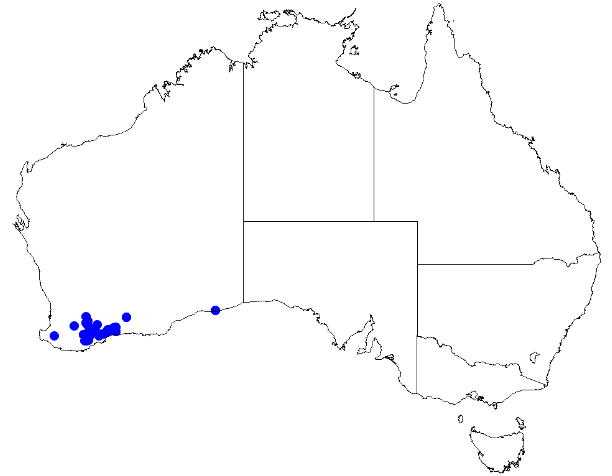
- Occurrence data from Australasian Virtual Herbarium

= Boronia octandra =

Species of flowering plant

Boronia octandra is a plant in the citrus family, Rutaceae and is endemic to the south-west of Western Australia. It is a small shrub with three-part leaves and greenish cream to reddish brown, four-petalled flowers.

== Description ==
Boronia octandra is a shrub that grows to a height of 30 cm (12 in) with its young stems covered with short, soft hairs. The leaves are trifoliate and each leaflet is more or less cylindrical to club-shaped and about 5 mm (0.20 in) long. The flowers are borne singly in leaf axils and are greenish cream to yellowish brown on a top-shaped pedicel about 2 mm (0.079 in) long. The four sepals are egg-shaped, about 3 mm (0.1 in) long and the four petals are broadly elliptic and about 8 mm (0.3 in) long. The eight stamens are all fertile and alternate in length with those adjacent to the petals shorter than those adjacent to the sepals. Flowering occurs from June to October.

== Taxonomy and naming ==
Boronia octandra was first formally described in 1971 by Paul Wilson and the description was published in Nuytsia from a specimen he collected west of Ravensthorpe. The specific epithet (octandra) mean "eight male", referring to the stamens.

== Distribution and habitat ==
This boronia grows on undulating plains and breakaways in sandy soil. It is found between Gnowangerup and the West River in the Esperance Plains, Hampton and Mallee biogeographic regions.

== Conservation status ==
Boronia octandra is classified as "not threatened" by the Department of Environment and Conservation (Western Australia).
