= Bunda Cliffs =

Escarpment in South and Western Australia

Coordinates: 31°28′26″S 131°07′08″E

Location of Bunda Cliffs

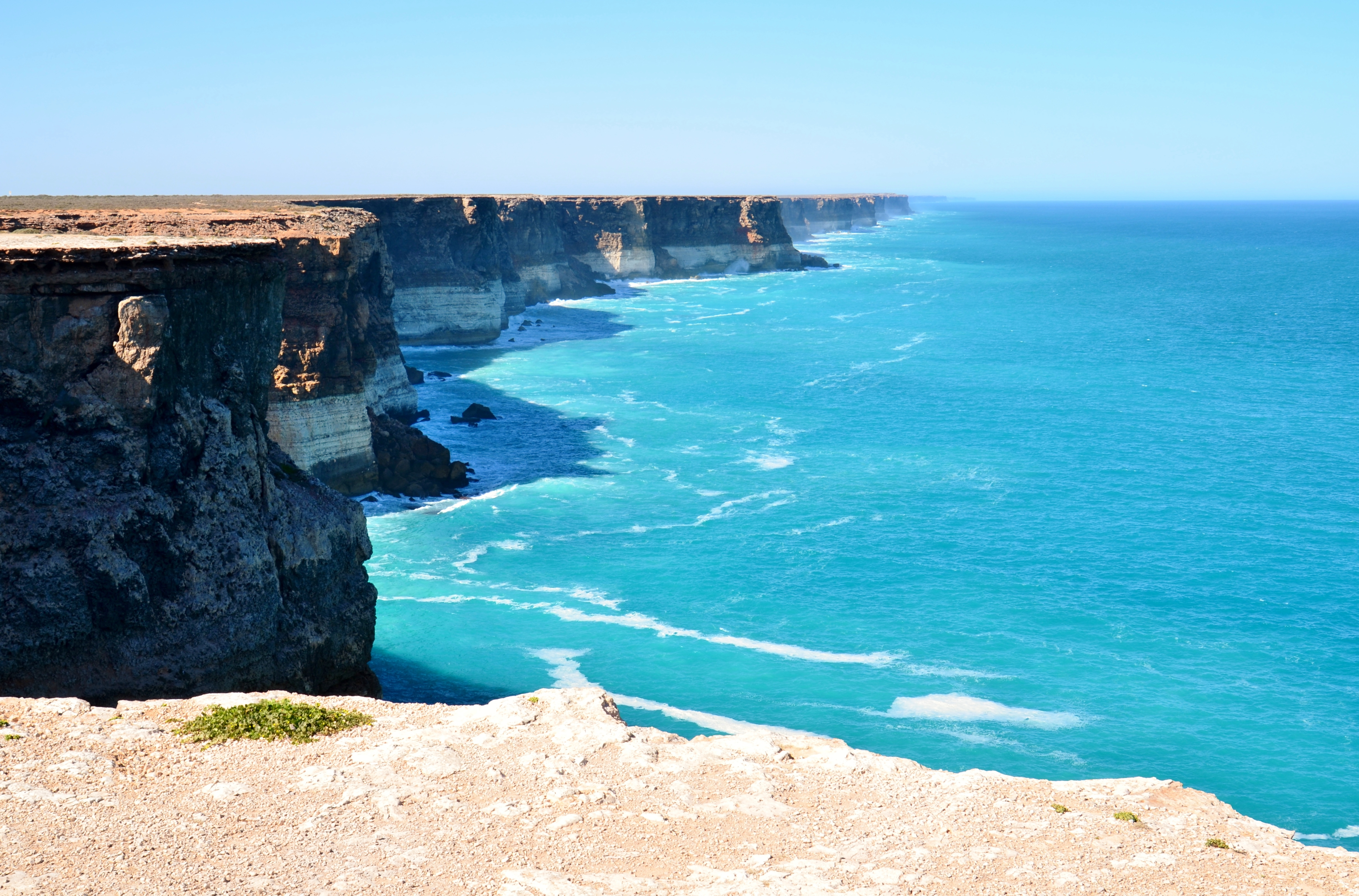
The Bunda Cliffs from a lookout on the Eyre Highway near Nullarbor.

The Bunda Cliffs, also known as the Nullarbor Cliffs, are a coastal scarp on the southern coast of Australia, extending from the western coast of South Australia to the south-eastern corner of Western Australia.

== Geography ==
The Bunda Cliffs extend for 210 kilometres (130 mi) along the shore of the Great Australian Bight near its northern extremity. The cliffs extend from Head of the Bight in the east to Eucla, Western Australia in the west. There are some local cliff-line breaks towards the eastern and western ends, with a 160 kilometres (99 mi) uninterrupted cliff line from near the eastern end to a point 28 km west of the South Australia–Western Australia border.

The cliffs are bounded on the north by the arid Nullarbor Plain, in a very sparsely settled area of Australia. The cliffs, which are some 60–120 metres (200–390 ft) in height, can be viewed from several viewing points along the Eyre Highway east of Eucla and west of Nullarbor roadhouse.

== Geology ==
Geologically the cliffs are made of Cenozoic age fossiliferous limestone, part of the Eucla Basin geologic formation. They are the eastern portion of the Great Southern Scarp, an 820-kilometre-long formation which extends across the Eucla Basin. The cliffs are subjected to high-energy waves from the Southern Ocean, and are receding northwards. The same formation extends from Eucla to Madura in Western Australia where it forms the scarp separating the Roe Plains from the Hampton Tableland, but in this section the coastline has moved away from the cliffs. The scarp in this area runs parallel to, and within sight of, the Eyre Highway. The Baxter Cliffs west of the Roe Plains are a further continuation of the escarpment, stretching for nearly 160 km along the coast.

== Naming ==
Bunda is an aboriginal word, which has been used in South Australia for the name of the Nullarbor coastal cliffs. The name was gazetted by the Government of South Australia on 2 October 2014 in response to a submission from the Department of Environment, Water and Natural Resources for approval to use it for a sanctuary zone in the Far West Coast Marine Park and refers to the extent of cliff line extending from the Western Australian border to the Head of the Bight.

== Protected areas ==
Most of the cliffs are in protected areas. Nullarbor Wilderness Protection Area extends eastwards from the Western Australia-South Australia border. Yalata Indigenous Protected Area covers the eastern portion of the cliffs. Eucla National Park protects the Western Australian portion of the cliffs. Far West Coast Marine Park includes the South Australian waters along the cliffs.
