= Eucla Basin =

Artesian depression in Western and South Australia

Coordinates: 32°25′09.12″S 127°52′12.78″E

The Eucla Basin is an artesian depression located in Western Australia and South Australia. The onshore-offshore depression covers approximately 1,141,000 km^{2} and slopes southward to an open bay known as the Great Australian Bight.

It extends more than 500 km offshore and about 350 km inland from the coastline. The Eucla Basin is a Cenozoic basin consisting mostly of carbonate sediments and sedimentary rocks. The basin contains a sandstone aquifer at its base (confined), and an unconfined limestone aquifer.

The surface area of the basin (and Nullarbor Plain) consists mostly of grazing and rangeland, but nickel and gold are mined at the western end. Very few people live in this part of the country, with most of the region having fewer than one inhabitant per km^{2}. In normal years, the area receives less than 250 mm of precipitation. Due to a shortage of regional seals and source rocks, the basin has poor petroleum prospects, but it is forming as a major zircon producing area, and includes the Cyclone Zircon Project.

== Physiography ==
The Eucla Basin is one of the distinct physiographic provinces of the larger West Australian Shield. It includes the smaller Eyre Coastal Plain and Eucla Shelf physiographic sections.

The physiographic units within the basin are:

- Bunda Plateau - the plateau.
- Wylie Scarp, Baxter Cliffs, Hampton Range, and Bunda Cliffs - the scarp
- Roe Plains and Israelite Plain - the plains
- Eucla Shelf - continental shelf

== See also ==
- Encyclopædia Britannica - (note: Britannica lists the basin's area at 180,000 km²—a 2005 report by the Australian government gives a figure of more than 1.1 million km²).
- Eucla Basin, Geoscience Australia (Australian government report) -
- National Geographic Atlas of the World
- World Mining News -
