= Eucalyptus surgens =

Conservation status
- Data Deficient (IUCN 3.1)

Scientific classification
- Kingdom: Plantae
- Clade: Tracheophytes
- Clade: Angiosperms
- Clade: Eudicots
- Clade: Rosids
- Order: Myrtales
- Family: Myrtaceae
- Genus: Eucalyptus
- Species: E. surgens

Binomial name
- Eucalyptus surgens Brooker & Hopper

Species of eucalyptus

Eucalyptus surgens is a species of mallee that is endemic to a small area on the south coast of Western Australia. It has rough bark near the base of the stems, glossy green lance-shaped leaves, flower buds in groups of seven, creamy yellow flowers and cup-shaped to cylindrical fruit.

== Description ==
Eucalyptus surgens is a mallee that typically grows to a height of 2.5 m (8 ft 2 in), forms a lignotuber and has smooth bark apart from some rough bark near the base of the trunk. Young plants and coppice regrowth have dull bluish green, broadly lance-shaped to egg-shaped leaves that are 55–60 mm (2.2–2.4 in) long, 25–35 mm (0.98–1.38 in) wide and petiolate. Adult leaves are the same shade of glossy light green on both sides, lance-shaped, up to 100 mm (3.9 in) long and 20 mm (0.79 in) wide. The flower buds are arranged in leaf axils on a thick, unbranched peduncle 3–5 mm (0.12–0.20 in) long, the individual buds on short pedicels. Mature buds have a bell-shaped floral cup and a cap-shaped operculum about 15 mm (0.59 in) long, 8 mm (0.31 in) wide and shorter than the floral cup. The flowers are creamy yellow and the fruit is a woody, cup-shaped to cylindrical capsule about 12 mm (0.47 in) long and 9 mm (0.35 in) wide with the valves below rim level.

== Taxonomy and naming ==
Eucalyptus surgens was first formally described in 1993 by Ian Brooker and Stephen Hopper in the journal Nuytsia from specimens collected by Hopper near Toolinna Cove in 1989. The specific epithet (surgens) is a Latin word meaning "rising", referring to a prominent vertical scar on the rim of the fruit.

== Distribution and habitat ==
This mallee is only known from the type location near the coast on the western edge of the Nullarbor Plain.

== See also ==
- List of Eucalyptus species
