= Point Culver =

Headland on south coast of Western Australia

Point Culver is a headland on the south coast of Western Australia. It is located at 32°54′S 124°41′E, near the western end of the Great Australian Bight. The point marks the western end of the Baxter Cliffs, which extend eastwards for nearly 200 kilometres (120 mi) along the coast.

It was discovered on 18 January 1801 by Matthew Flinders:

The shore curved round here, and took a more eastern direction; and the bank of level land, which continued to run along behind it, approached very near to the water side. Three leagues further on it formed cliffs upon the coast; and a projecting part of them, which I called Point Culver, bore N. 77° E. four leagues: this was the furthest land in sight.

The white cliffs reminded Flinders of the cliffs of Culver Down on the Isle of Wight.

The area was explored by land in the 1860s.

It defines part of the coast where there are three possible locations of access by boat, Toolinna Cove and Twilight Cove being the other two locations.

== General references ==
- Point Culver in the Gazetteer of Australia online

== Sources ==
- Flinders, Matthew (1814). A Voyage to Terra Australis: Undertaken for the Purpose of Completing the Discovery of that Vast Country, and Prosecuted in the Years 1801, 1802, and 1803, in His Majesty's Ship the Investigator. Vol. 1. London: G. Nicol & Son. Wikidata Q19027014.
