= Baxter Cliffs =

Coastal cliffs in Western Australia

Coordinates: 32°50′51″S 124°51′49″E

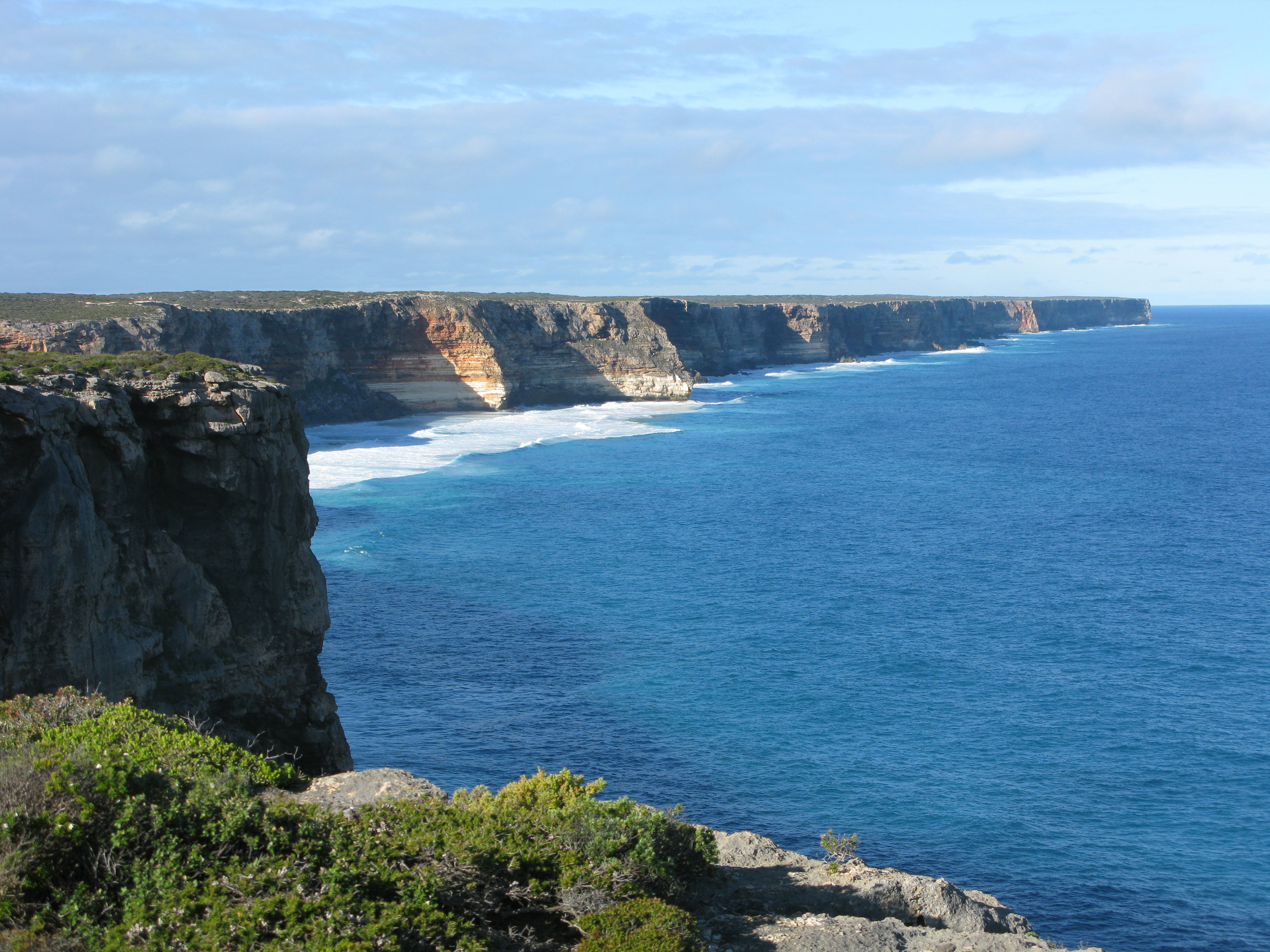
Baxter Cliffs at Toolinna Cove

The Baxter Cliffs is a long stretch of coastal cliff on the south coast of Western Australia.

The cliffs are up to 80 metres (260 ft) high and extend for almost 200 kilometres (120 mi) along the coast, from Point Culver in the west, which marks the northern end of the Israelite Plain, northeastwards to Twilight Cove in the east, which is the transition from the cliffs to the coastal Roe Plains. Toolinna Cove is the only place along the Baxter Cliffs where a boat can be landed.

The Baxter Cliffs are part of a long erosional escarpment which extends east and west across the Eucla Basin sedimentary formation. Other portions of the escarpment include the Hampton Tableland north of the Roe Plains, and the Bunda Cliffs east of the Roe Plains in South Australia.

The cliffs are named after John Baxter, a companion of the explorer Edward John Eyre, who was killed there by two Aboriginals from Eyre's exploration party in April 1841.
