= Cyclone Zircon Project =

Mineral sands deposit in Australia

Coordinates: 28°26′00″S 128°06′00″E

- Interactive map of Cyclone Zircon Project
- Location: Western Australia, Australia
- Products: Ilmenite, Rutile, (Zirconium, Zircon, Leucoxene)

The Cyclone Zircon Project is a large mineral sands deposit located in the Eucla Basin in Western Australia, near the border with South Australia. Cyclone represents one of the largest zirconium reserves in Australia having estimated reserves of 98 million tonnes of ore grading 0.95% zirconium metal.
