= Toolinna Rockhole =

Rockhole in southern Western Australia

Coordinates: 32°45′S 124°59′E

Toolinna Rockhole is a rockhole on the Nullarbor Plain in southern Western Australia. The explorer Edward John Eyre is thought to have visited it on 2 May 1842, but found it empty.

== See also ==
- Toolinna Cove
