= Mineral absorption =

Ways in which minerals enter cellular material

In plants and animals, mineral absorption, also called mineral uptake is the way in which minerals enter the cellular material, typically following the same pathway as water. In plants, the entrance portal for mineral uptake is usually through the roots. Some mineral ions diffuse in-between the cells. In contrast to water, some minerals are actively taken up by plant cells. Mineral nutrient concentration in roots may be 10,000 times more than in surrounding soil. During transport throughout a plant, minerals can exit xylem and enter cells that require them. Mineral ions cross plasma membranes by a chemiosmotic mechanism. Plants absorb minerals in ionic form: nitrate (NO_{3}^{−}), phosphate (HPO_{4}^{−}) and potassium ions (K^{+}); all have difficulty crossing a charged plasma membrane.

It has long been known plants expend energy to actively take up and concentrate mineral ions. Proton pump hydrolyzes adenosine triphosphate (ATP) to transport H^{+} ions out of cell; this sets up an electrochemical gradient that causes positive ions to flow into cells. Negative ions are carried across the plasma membrane in conjunction with H^{+} ions as H^{+} ions diffuse down their concentration gradient.

In animals, minerals found in low amounts are microminerals while the seven elements that are required in large quantity are known as macrominerals; these are Ca, P, Mg, Na, K, Cl, and S. In most cases, minerals that enter the blood pass through the epithelial cells which line the gastrointestinal mucosa of the small intestine. Minerals can diffuse through the pores of the tight junction in paracellular absorption if there is an electrochemical gradient. Through the process of solvent drag, minerals can also enter with water when solubilized by dipole-ion interactions. Furthermore, the absorption of trace elements can be enhanced by the presence of amino acids that are covalently bonded to the mineral.

== See also ==
- Soil contamination
