= Nuytsland Nature Reserve =

Nature reserve in Western Australia

- IUCN category Ia (strict nature reserve)
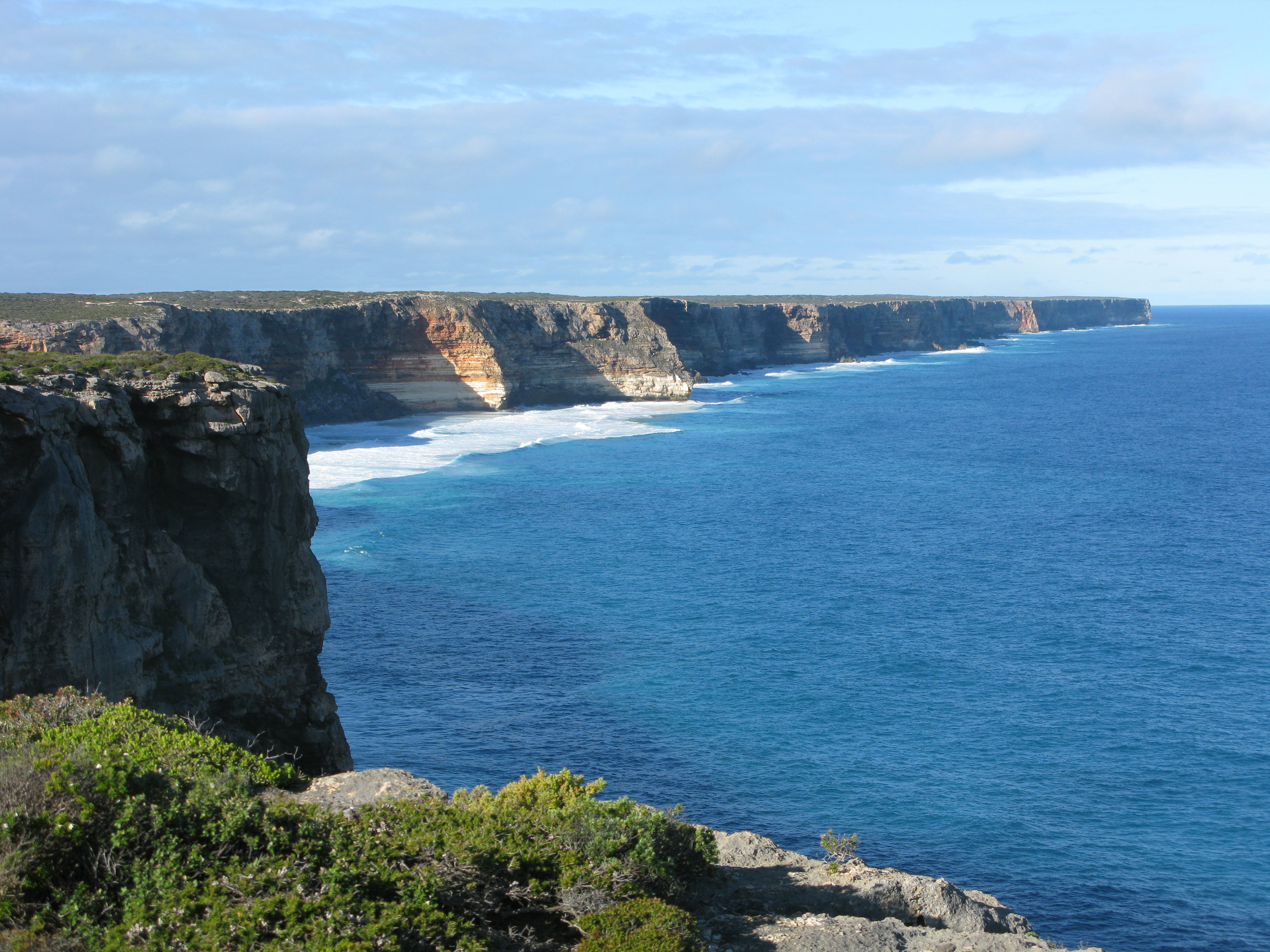
- The Great Australian Bight and Baxter Cliffs at Toolinna Cove, Nuytsland Nature Reserve, 2010

- Location within Western Australia
- Location: Western Australia
- Nearest city: Esperance
- Coordinates: 32°18′0″S 125°52′0″E
- Area: 6,253.44 km^{2} (2,414.47 sq mi)
- Established: 1969
- Governing body: Department of Parks and Wildlife

Nuytsland Nature Reserve is a protected area of Western Australia in the south-eastern part of the state, on the south coast.

== Geography ==
Nominally located at 32°18′S 125°52′E, it has an area of 6,253.44 square kilometres (2,414.47 sq mi), and takes in over 500 kilometres (310 mi) of coastline from Cape Pasley to Red Rocks Point.

In the southwest the reserve includes the Israelite Plain, a coastal plain with broad beaches, dunes, sandplains, and coastal lagoons which includes Israelite Bay. The middle section of the reserve protects the Baxter Cliffs, dramatic seacliffs that extend up to 80 metres (260 ft) high for over 190 kilometres (120 mi) along the coast. The Baxter Cliffs feature Toolinna Cove and Twilight Cove. The reserve boundary extends northwards near Cocklebiddy to encompass Cocklebiddy Cave on the Hampton Tableland. The eastern end of the reserve includes the western portion of the Roe Plains, with extensive coastal dunes and sandplains. Eyre Bird Observatory is located near Cocklebiddy, where the cliffs transition to the Roe Plains.

At the reserve's western end it adjoins Cape Arid National Park. Ngadju Indigenous Protected Area bounds the western portion of the reserve on the north.

== Flora and fauna ==
Plant communities include heath on the western coastal plains and headlands, woodlands and mallee dominated by eucalypts, and bluebush (Maireana spp.) shrublands in the east.

The reserve has been surveyed for the western ground parrot (Pezoporus flaviventris).

== Conservation ==
The reserve was declared on 25 June 1965 and gazetted on 7 November 1969 and named for the Nuyts cadastral division within which it lies, named in honour of the infamous Pieter Nuyts, the highest ranking member of the Dutch East India Company aboard 't Gulden Zeepaert when she mapped the southwestern Australian coast, after which it was sometimes known as Nuytsland (French: Terre de Nuits).

== Climate ==
Climate data for Eyre (6m elevation) 1991–2020
Month	Jan	Feb	Mar	Apr	May	Jun	Jul	Aug	Sep	Oct	Nov	Dec	Year
Record high °C (°F)	48.5 (119.3)	46.9 (116.4)	45.7 (114.3)	41.5 (106.7)	37.5 (99.5)	30.4 (86.7)	31.0 (87.8)	35.3 (95.5)	38.5 (101.3)	44.7 (112.5)	45.4 (113.7)	47.5 (117.5)	48.5 (119.3)
Mean daily maximum °C (°F)	27.5 (81.5)	27.1 (80.8)	26.3 (79.3)	25.0 (77.0)	22.1 (71.8)	19.7 (67.5)	19.1 (66.4)	20.4 (68.7)	22.2 (72.0)	24.3 (75.7)	25.4 (77.7)	26.7 (80.1)	23.8 (74.8)
Mean daily minimum °C (°F)	15.2 (59.4)	15.9 (60.6)	14.0 (57.2)	11.3 (52.3)	8.3 (46.9)	6.0 (42.8)	5.0 (41.0)	5.5 (41.9)	7.3 (45.1)	9.9 (49.8)	11.9 (53.4)	14.0 (57.2)	10.4 (50.7)
Record low °C (°F)	2.5 (36.5)	1.5 (34.7)	0.5 (32.9)	−2.0 (28.4)	−2.9 (26.8)	−6.2 (20.8)	−5.2 (22.6)	−7.2 (19.0)	−5.5 (22.1)	−5.0 (23.0)	−2.1 (28.2)	0.2 (32.4)	−7.2 (19.0)
Average rainfall mm (inches)	27.1 (1.07)	34.2 (1.35)	31.5 (1.24)	29.4 (1.16)	31.4 (1.24)	34.6 (1.36)	36.5 (1.44)	30.2 (1.19)	28.0 (1.10)	22.1 (0.87)	27.6 (1.09)	29.0 (1.14)	361.2 (14.22)
Average rainy days	5.6	6.2	8.0	8.5	10.5	10.5	11.0	10.3	9.1	7.8	7.5	6.2	101.2
Source: bom.gov.au
