= Eyre Bird Observatory =

Bird observatory on the south east coast of Western Australia

- Location within Western Australia

General information
- Type: Heritage listed building
- Location: Great Australian Bight, Western Australia
- Coordinates: 32°14′47″S 126°18′06″E

Western Australia Heritage Register
- Type: State Registered Place
- Designated: 28 November 2003
- Reference no.: 16522

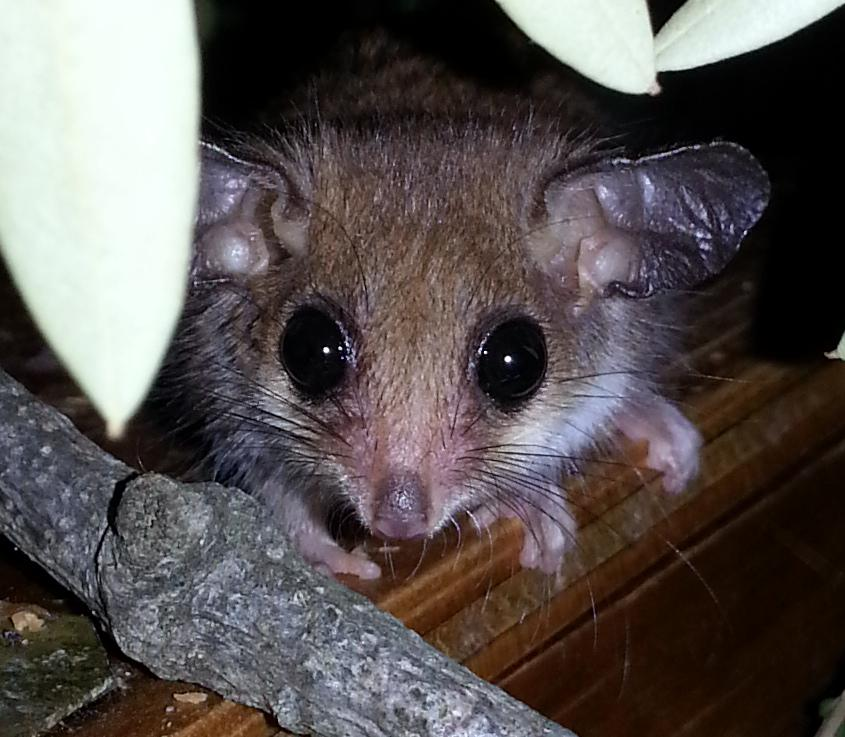
The western pygmy possum nests in the surrounding mallee woodland.

Eyre Bird Observatory is an educational, scientific and recreational facility in the Nuytsland Nature Reserve, Western Australia. Cocklebiddy is the nearest locality on the Eyre Highway, 49 km (30 mi) to the north. It is in the Hampton bioregion, which is sandwiched between the Nullarbor Plain to the north and the Great Australian Bight to the south, in one of the least populated places on the Australian continent. It was established in 1977 by Birds Australia in the disused Eyre Telegraph Station as Australia's first bird observatory, to provide a base for the study and enjoyment of the birds of the area.

Western Australia's official lowest temperature of −7.2 °C (19.0 °F) was recorded at Eyre Bird Observatory on 17 August 2008.

== History ==
During their nearly 2,000-mile (3,200 km) journey overland from Adelaide to Albany in 1841, 26-year-old Edward John Eyre and his party - companion John Baxter and three Aboriginal men - found fresh water 2 metres (6.6 ft) beneath a coastal sand dune, and camped there for a month, recovering from severe dehydration and exhaustion. This location became known as Eyre's Sand Patch.

When the Inter-Colonial Telegraph Line reached the Patch in 1877, a weatherboard and corrugated iron building was erected to house a permanently staffed repeater station, and the location was subsequently known as the Eyre Telegraph Station.

Twenty years later, in 1897, the station moved into a new limestone and corrugated iron building nearby until, in 1927 when the telegraph line moved 150 kilometres (93 mi) north to follow the Trans-Australian Railway, the building was abandoned.

Fifty years later, in 1977, the limestone building was restored by volunteers with the support of the Post Office Historical Society and Birds Australia, using materials supplied by the WA Department of Fisheries and Wildlife, and it now functions as a permanent bird observatory. The building is maintained by volunteers, including two caretakers who live on site for three months at a time.

== Birdlife ==
Honeyeaters who spend the summer in the deep south-west extend their range north and east in the winter to feast on the flowering mallee and, at Eyre, honeyeaters, silvereyes and other species are found wintering in the narrow coastal mallee strip. A breeding colony of little penguins spends the summer west of Eyre at Twilight Cove. By 2008, 245 bird species had been recorded in the surrounding nature reserve.

== Climate ==
Eyre Bird Observatory has a semi-arid climate (BSk) with warm-to-hot dry summers and mild-to-cool wetter winters. It is subject to extreme temperatures, particularly cool minima, having received Western Australia's lowest minimum temperature of −7.2 °C (19.0 °F) on 17 August 2008 and Australia's highest diurnal range (difference between daily minimum and maximum temperatures) of 37.4 °C (67.3 °F) on 5 March 2008, when the temperature ranged from 6.8 to 44.2 °C (44.2 to 111.6 °F). Factors that cause the lower minimum temperatures despite the observatory being within 1 kilometre (0.6 mi) of the coast include its sandy surface, its location in a shallow depression, and a sand ridge between it and the ocean that cuts it off from shallow marine air masses on calm nights.

Climate data for Eyre Bird Observatory (1991–2020 normals, extremes 1983–present)
Month	Jan	Feb	Mar	Apr	May	Jun	Jul	Aug	Sep	Oct	Nov	Dec	Year
Record high °C (°F)	48.5 (119.3)	49.1 (120.4)	45.7 (114.3)	41.5 (106.7)	37.5 (99.5)	30.4 (86.7)	31.0 (87.8)	35.4 (95.7)	38.5 (101.3)	44.7 (112.5)	45.4 (113.7)	47.5 (117.5)	49.1 (120.4)
Mean maximum °C (°F)	42.2 (108.0)	40.4 (104.7)	38.8 (101.8)	34.7 (94.5)	30.7 (87.3)	25.7 (78.3)	25.9 (78.6)	29.8 (85.6)	34.4 (93.9)	39.2 (102.6)	39.6 (103.3)	40.7 (105.3)	45.0 (113.0)
Mean daily maximum °C (°F)	27.5 (81.5)	27.1 (80.8)	26.3 (79.3)	25.0 (77.0)	22.1 (71.8)	19.7 (67.5)	19.1 (66.4)	20.4 (68.7)	22.2 (72.0)	24.3 (75.7)	25.4 (77.7)	26.7 (80.1)	23.8 (74.9)
Daily mean °C (°F)	21.4 (70.5)	21.5 (70.7)	20.2 (68.4)	18.2 (64.8)	15.2 (59.4)	12.9 (55.2)	12.1 (53.8)	13.0 (55.4)	14.8 (58.6)	17.1 (62.8)	18.7 (65.7)	20.4 (68.7)	17.1 (62.8)
Mean daily minimum °C (°F)	15.2 (59.4)	15.9 (60.6)	14.0 (57.2)	11.3 (52.3)	8.3 (46.9)	6.0 (42.8)	5.0 (41.0)	5.5 (41.9)	7.3 (45.1)	9.9 (49.8)	11.9 (53.4)	14.0 (57.2)	10.4 (50.6)
Mean minimum °C (°F)	5.8 (42.4)	6.1 (43.0)	4.5 (40.1)	1.4 (34.5)	−0.3 (31.5)	−2.3 (27.9)	−2.9 (26.8)	−3.3 (26.1)	−2.4 (27.7)	−1.4 (29.5)	1.3 (34.3)	3.9 (39.0)	−4.5 (23.9)
Record low °C (°F)	2.5 (36.5)	1.5 (34.7)	0.5 (32.9)	−2.0 (28.4)	−2.9 (26.8)	−6.2 (20.8)	−5.9 (21.4)	−7.2 (19.0)	−5.5 (22.1)	−5.0 (23.0)	−2.1 (28.2)	0.2 (32.4)	−7.2 (19.0)
Average rainfall mm (inches)	27.1 (1.07)	34.2 (1.35)	31.5 (1.24)	29.4 (1.16)	31.4 (1.24)	34.6 (1.36)	36.5 (1.44)	30.2 (1.19)	28.0 (1.10)	22.1 (0.87)	27.6 (1.09)	29.0 (1.14)	361.6 (14.25)
Average rainy days (≥ 1 mm)	3.2	3.7	4.1	4.7	6.2	7.0	7.0	6.2	5.0	4.1	4.3	3.8	59.3
Average dew point °C (°F)	15.0 (59.0)	15.9 (60.6)	15.0 (59.0)	13.4 (56.1)	10.9 (51.6)	8.7 (47.7)	7.6 (45.7)	7.1 (44.8)	8.7 (47.7)	10.1 (50.2)	12.4 (54.3)	13.6 (56.5)	11.5 (52.8)
Source: Bureau of Meteorology (dew point for 3pm)
