= Toolinna Cove =

Small bay on south coast of Western Australia

Coordinates: 32°43′S 125°01′E

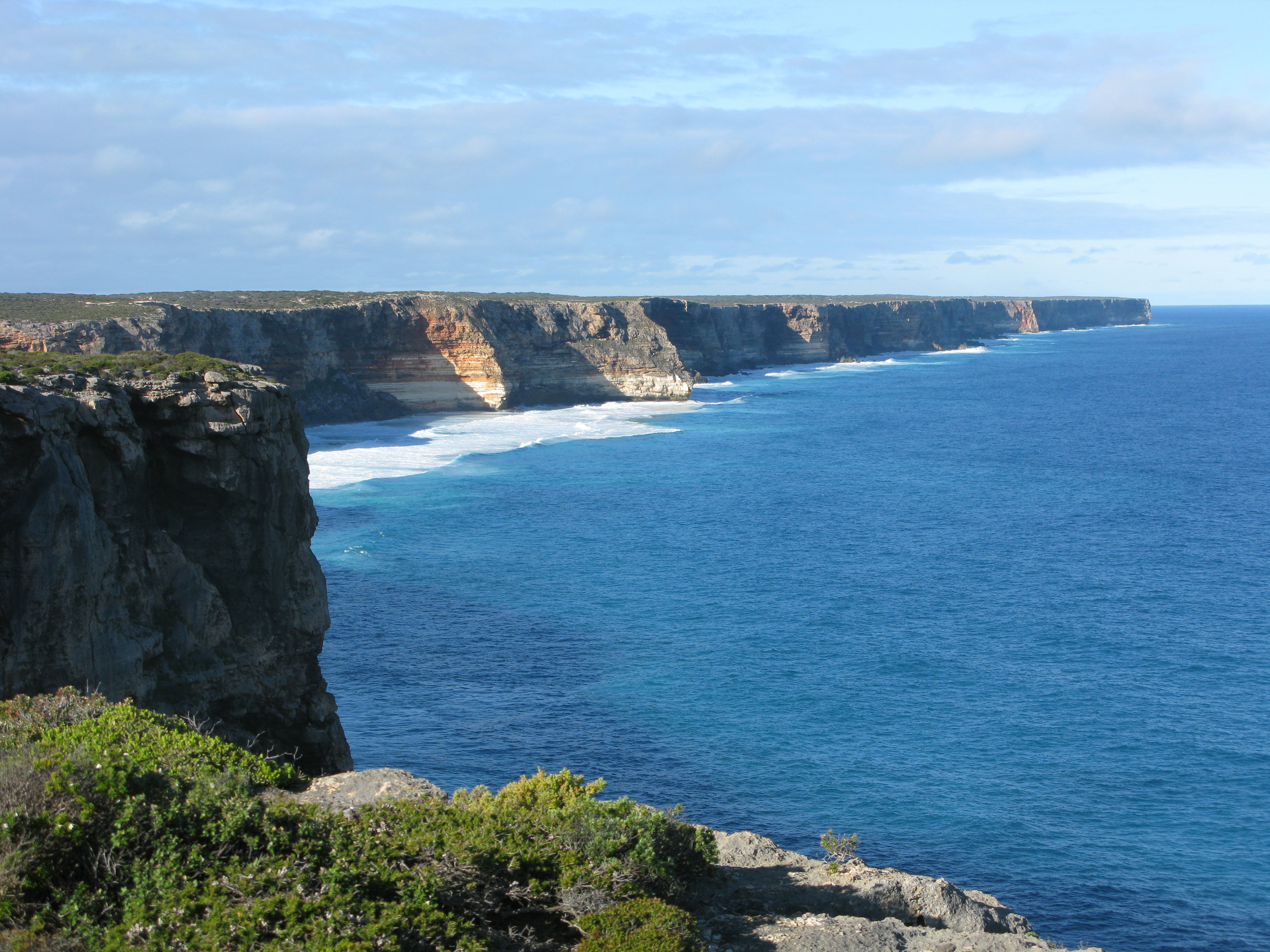
The Baxter Cliffs at Toolinna Cove

Toolinna Cove is a cove on the south coast of Western Australia. It is a sea-cove along the Baxter Cliffs at the western end of the Great Australian Bight, in Nuytsland Nature Reserve. It is the only place between Point Culver and Twilight Cove where a boat can be landed.

== See also ==
- Toolinna Rockhole
