= Hampton bioregion =

Bioregion in Western Australia

Hampton
- Region
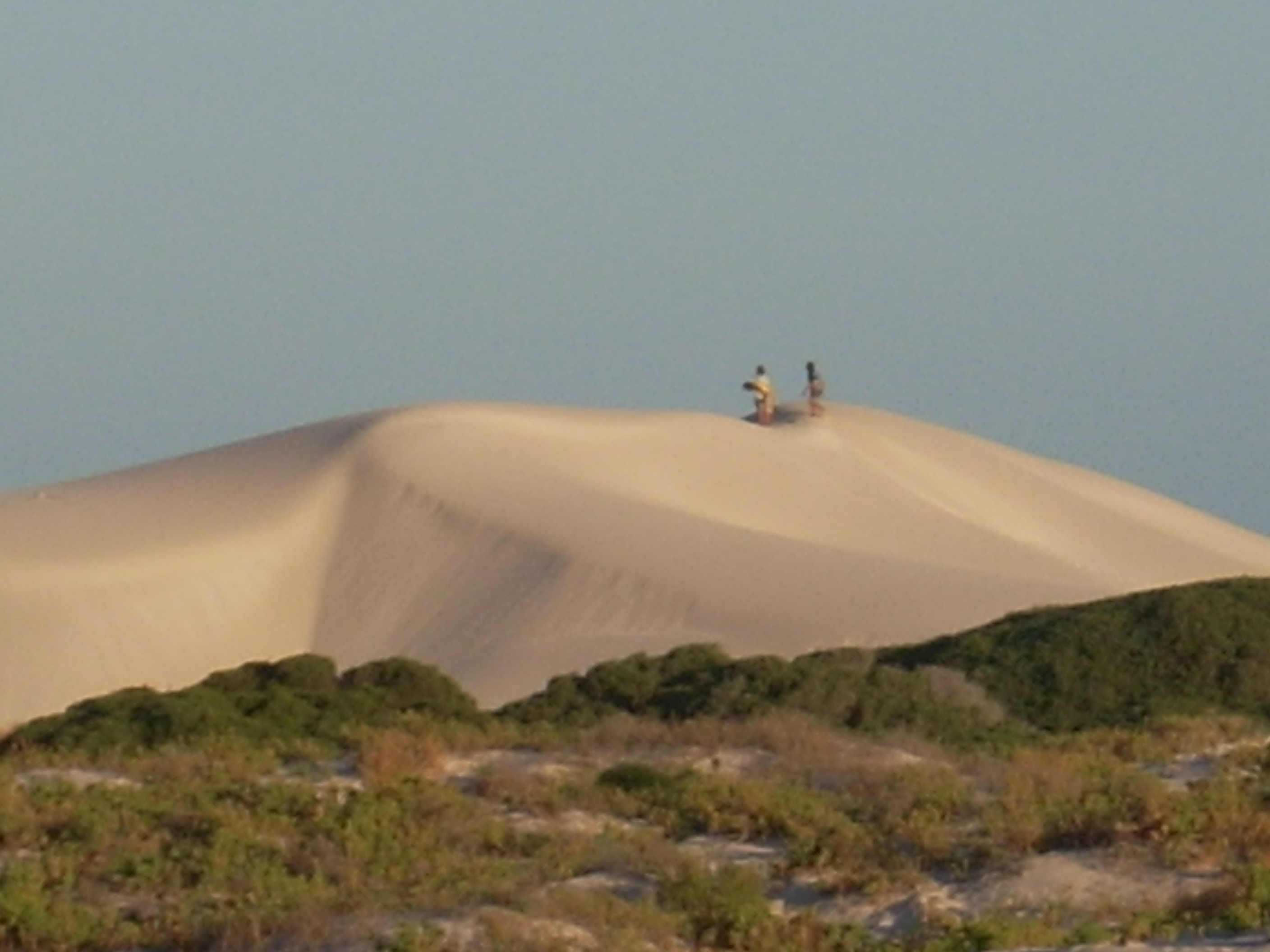
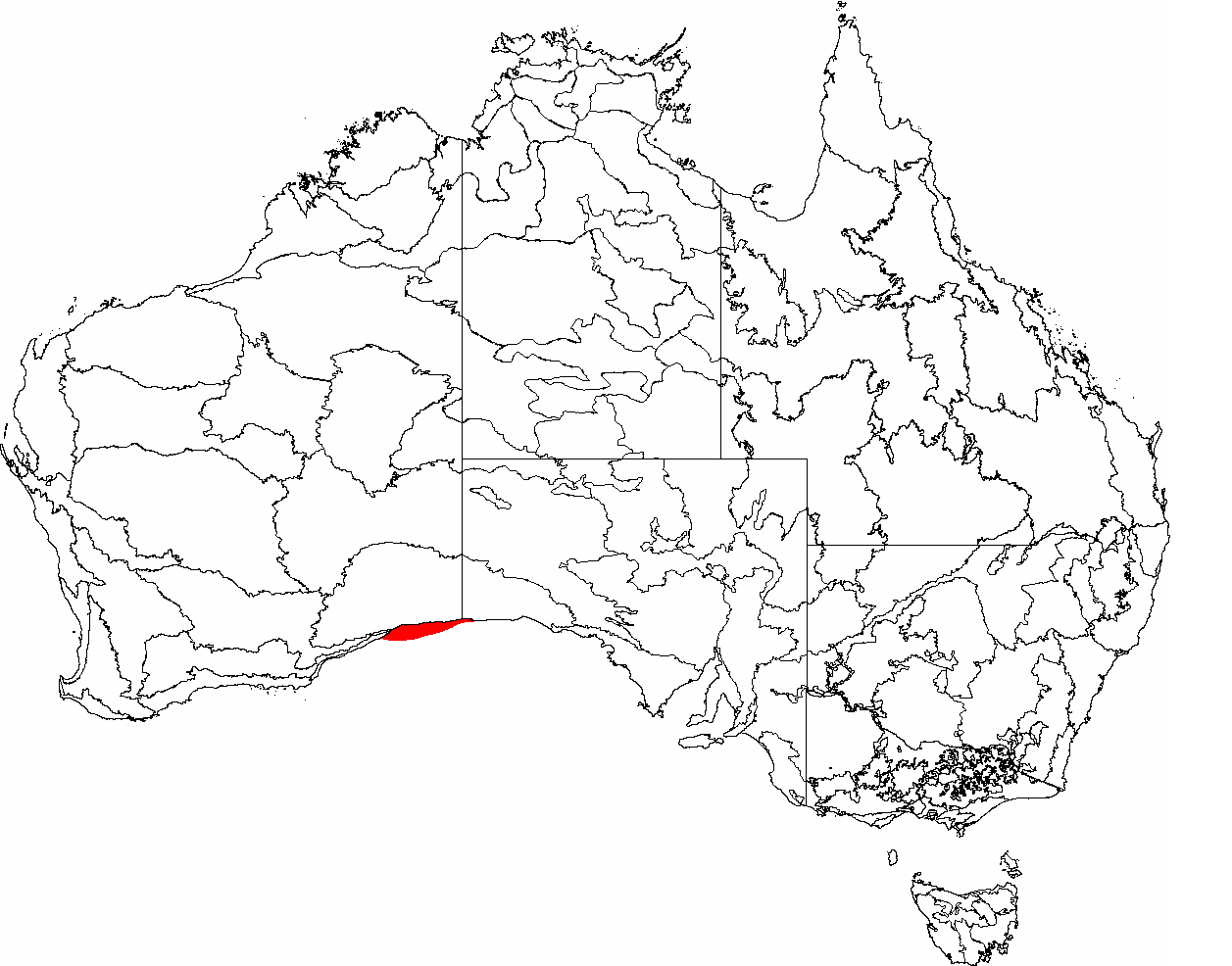
- Sand dunes and dune scrub near Eucla The interim Australian bioregions, with Hampton in red
- Country: Australia
- State: Western Australia

Area
  - Total: 10,881.98 km^{2} (4,201.56 sq mi)
Localities around Hampton
Nullarbor	Nullarbor	Nullarbor
Coolgardie	Hampton	Great Australian Bight
Mallee	Great Australian Bight	Great Australian Bight

Hampton is an interim Australian bioregion located in southeastern coastal Western Australia, with a small portion (4%) extending into adjacent South Australia. It has an area of 1,088,198 hectares (2,689,000 acres). The Hampton bioregion is part of the Coolgardie woodlands ecoregion.

== Geography ==
The bioregion includes a coastal plain, known as the Roe Plains, covered by extensive marine dunes, with a limestone escarpment, known as the Hampton Tableland or Hampton Range, emerging to the north of the dune fields. The bioregion is bounded on the north by the Nullarbor Plain, and on the south by the Great Australian Bight.

The escarpment is an outcrop of the Eucla Basin, a sedimentary geologic basin that extends under the entire region as well as the Nullarbor Plain to the north and under the sea to the south. Erosion of the Eucla Basin's limestone by rainwater and groundwater has created a karst landscape, with extensive underground sinkholes and caverns.

The region has a semi-arid Mediterranean climate, with mild to hot summers and cool to mild winters. The bioregion receives about 250mm of rainfall annually, mostly during the winter months.

== Flora and fauna ==
The plant communities of the bioregion include mallee woodlands and shrublands on scree slopes, limestone pavements, and dunes. They are characterised by mallee, shrubs or trees, generally eucalypts, with multiple stems rising from an underground woody base called a lignotuber. An endemic subspecies of coastal white mallee, Eucalyptus diversifolia hesperia, is a common mallee species. Mallee with patches of acacia scrub, featuring ridge-fruited mallee (Eucalyptus angulosa), coastal wattle (Acacia cyclops), Calothamnus quadrifidus, and granite bottlebrush (Melaleuca elliptica), is found on coastal dunes. Yorrell (Eucalyptus gracilis) is found on limestone and lime sands.

There are eucalypt woodlands, and open low woodlands of western myall (Acacia papyrocarpa) over bluebush (Maireana sp.), on the alluvial and calcareous plains below the escarpment. The hemiparasitic desert quandong or native peach (Santalum acuminatum) is found in the woodlands. Low dune vegetation, including Scaevola crassifolia and Atriplex cinerea, are found on more recent dune deposits.

Native birds include the malleefowl (Leipoa ocellata) and western subspecies of grey currawong (Strepera versicolor plumbei) and slender-billed thornbill (Acanthiza iredalei iredalei). The dunes are home to three endemic species of reptiles, Pseudemoia baudini, Lerista arenicola, and Lerista baynesi, along with one endemic sub-species (Ctenotus brooksi euclae).

Several species of cave fauna are endemic to the cave systems of the bioregion, which extend under the adjacent Nullarbor Plain. These include the spiders Tartarus mullamullangensis and Tartarus nurinensis.

== Threats ==
Threats to the bioregion include overgrazing by sheep, invasive animals like foxes, wild dogs, feral cats, starlings, camels, horses and rabbits, and invasive plants like Ward's weed (Carrichtera annua) and sea spurge (Euphorbia paralias).

== Protected areas ==
Protected areas include Nuytsland Nature Reserve and Eucla National Park in Western Australia, and Nullarbor National Park which protects the entire South Australian section.

The Eyre Bird Observatory is located in coastal mallee woodland in Nuytsland Nature Reserve. It was established in 1977, and includes a natural history library and a small museum.
