= Twilight Cove =

Cove of the Great Australian Bight

Coordinates: 32°16′29″S 126°02′53″E

Twilight Cove is situated at the end of the Baxter Cliffs on the south coast of Western Australia on the Great Australian Bight coastline. It has had other names, including Malbinya.

The local Aboriginal language for the area (known as Willilambie) was collected by Daisy Bates. It is 26 km south of Cocklebiddy roadhouse on the Eyre Highway and is considered a marker as the extent of the Baxter Cliffs, with Toolinna Cove the other.

Like most locations along the southern coast of Western Australia it is susceptible to king waves.

The cove has been the location of a number of shipwrecks. The Twilight (after which it is named) and the Bunyip were swept ashore during a storm on 24 May 1877. Both had been involved in transporting materials for the construction of a telegraph line. On 31 August 1896, the Swift struck a rock and was wrecked. The crews of all three vessels survived.
