= Cocklebiddy, Western Australia =

Roadhouse community in Western Australia

Cocklebiddy
- Town
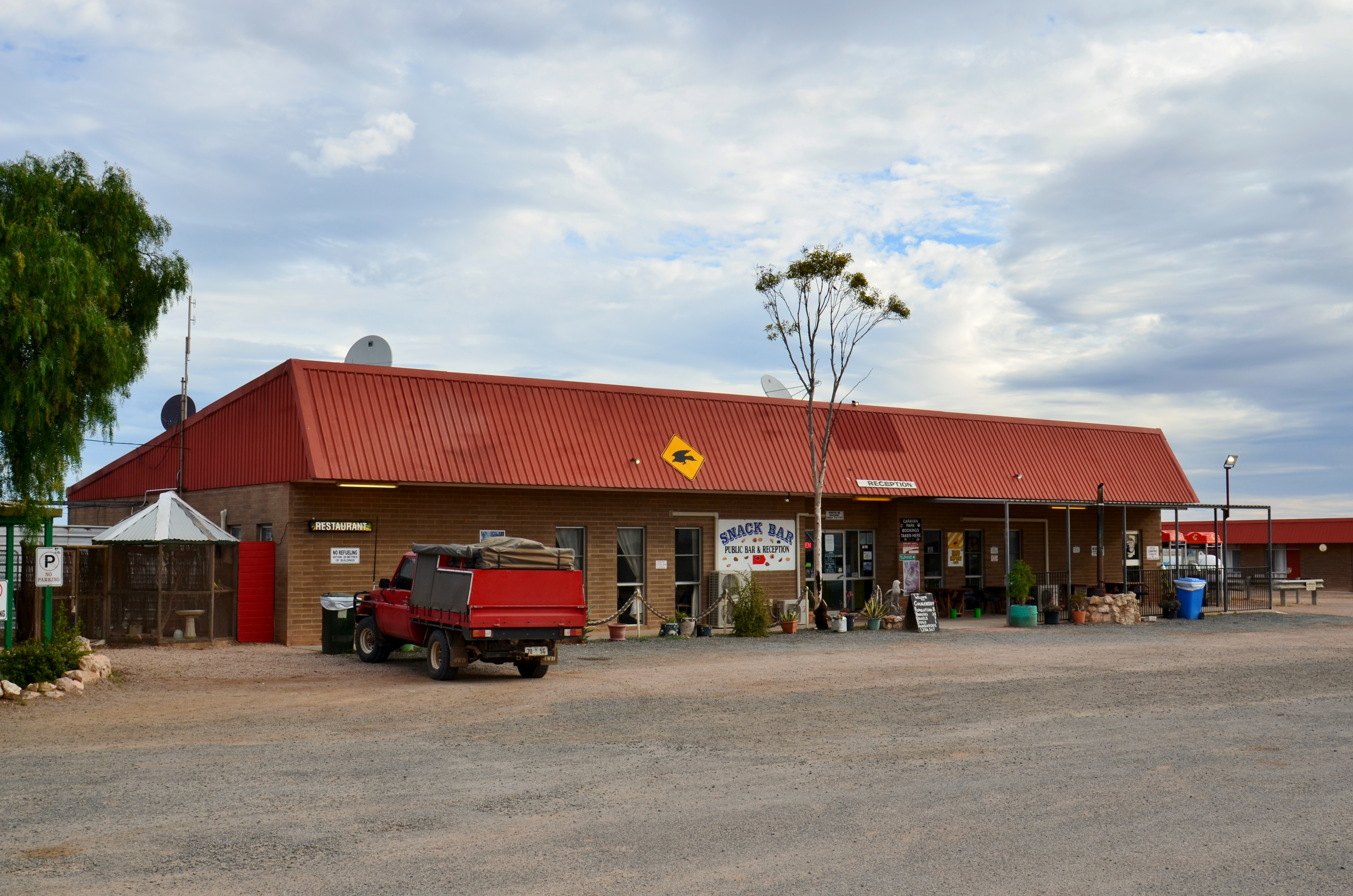
- The Wedgetail Inn, Cocklebiddy, 2017

- Interactive map of Cocklebiddy
- Coordinates: 32°2′24″S 126°5′46″E
- Country: Australia
- State: Western Australia
- LGA: Shire of Dundas
- Location: 1,163 km (723 mi) E of Perth; 439 km (273 mi) E of Norseman; 273 km (170 mi) W of Eucla
- Established: 1879

Government
  - State electorate: Kalgoorlie
  - Federal division: O'Connor

Area
  - Total: 8,765.2 km^{2} (3,384.3 sq mi)
- Elevation: 94 m (308 ft)

Population
  - Total: 15 (SAL 2021)
- Postcode: 6443

Cocklebiddy is a small roadhouse community located on the Eyre Highway in Western Australia. It is the third stop after Norseman on the journey eastwards across the Nullarbor Plain. Like other locations in the region, the site consists of little more than a roadhouse.

It is the nearest locality to the coastal feature of Twilight Cove, which is 26 km (16 mi) to the south. Cocklebiddy follows the time zone used by Eucla of UTC+8:45. It is situated 284 km (176 mi) from Border Village.

== History ==
=== 1800s and 1900s ===
Cocklebiddy started as an Aboriginal mission station, of which only the stone foundations remain today.

The area was thought to be a potential water source and, during World War II, Army engineers attempted to tap fresh water from the lakes, but it was found that a thin skin of fresh water overlay a vast volume of saline water.

The Eyre Telegraph Station, located 49 km (30 mi) south of the settlement, operated from 1897 until 1929. Unlike most others, it remained in a relatively well-preserved state due to its isolation and protection from the Southern Ocean, and in 1976, when the State Government created the Nuytsland Nature Reserve, the building became the Eyre Bird Observatory, which opened in 1978. The observatory offers basic camping facilities. Over 230 species of birds have been recorded there.

=== 2000s ===
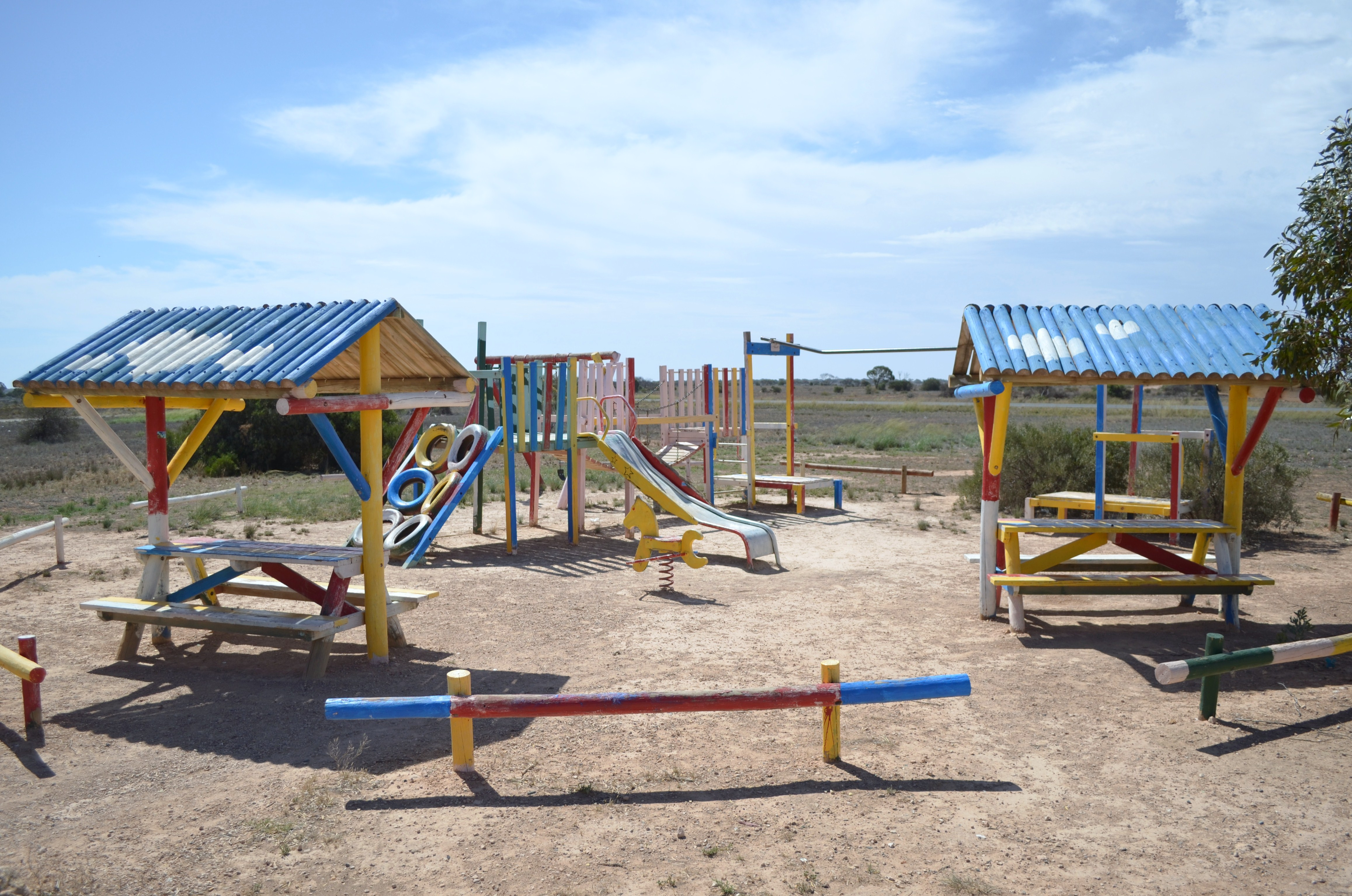
The playground at the roadhouse

A new species in the Restionaceae (a family of tussock-like plants), namely Harperia eyreana, was discovered about 20 km (12 mi) to the south-west of Cocklebiddy, and described in 2000.

Cocklebiddy was visited in 2007 by the Australian comedic duo, Hamish and Andy.

== Caving ==
The Cocklebiddy area is noted for its caves, the most notable of which is Cocklebiddy cave – a single passage more than 6 km (3.7 mi) long, of which around 90% is underwater and only accessible via cave diving. In August 1983, a French team set a world record here for the longest cave dive in the world. In October that year, the French record was beaten by an Australian team when Hugh Morrison of Western Australia pushed another 280 m (920 ft) beyond where the French had tied off. In 1995 South Australian cave diver Christopher Brown went another 20 m (66 ft) further again, and in late 2008 much of the cave's more distant regions were explored, mapped (using radio-location "pingers" designed and operated by Ken Smith) and videotaped by Craig Challen and Richard Harris et al using rebreather technology. (Challen and Harris would later be better known for their involvement in the 2018 Tham Luang cave rescue.)

== See also ==
- List of caves in Western Australia
- Cave Divers Association of Australia
- Agnes Milowka
- Leigh Bishop
- The Quiet Achiever
- Nurina Land District
