= Hampton Tableland =

Tableland in Western Australia

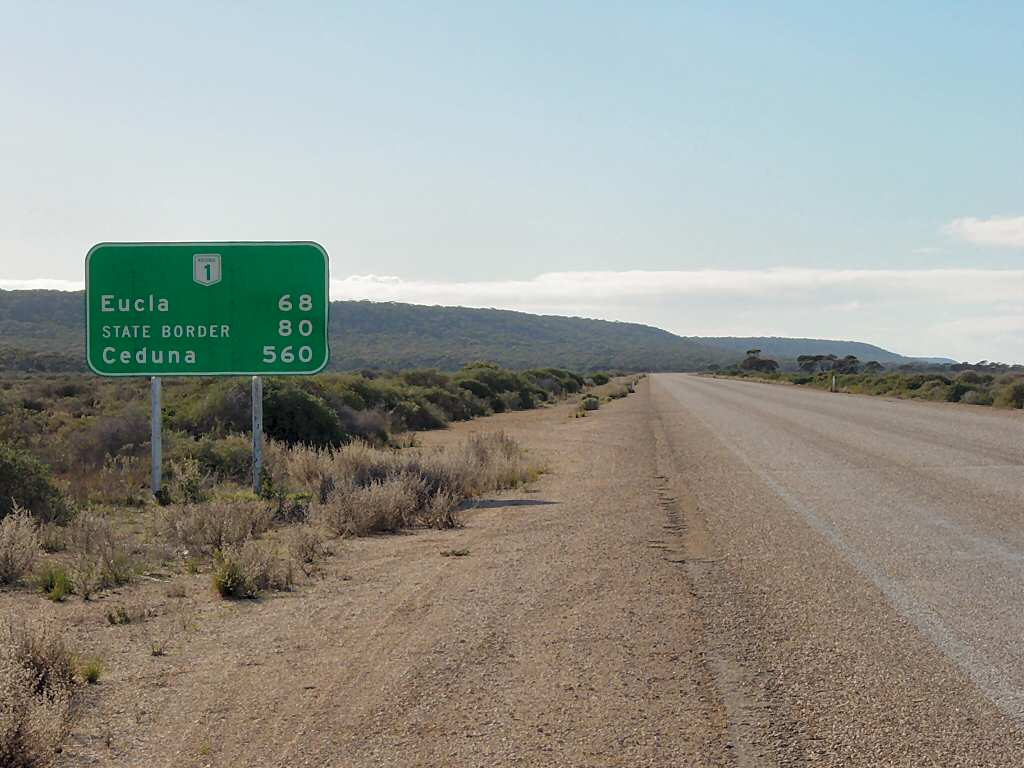
Eastern end of the escarpment of the tableland from Eyre Highway heading east

Hampton Tableland is a feature that is found at the northern side of the current alignment of the Eyre Highway between Madura and Eucla in Western Australia, at the southern edge of the Nullarbor Plain.

Earlier trans-Nullarbor tracks were located along different routes from the current highway.

The tableland has a number of caves occurring on it, some with notable features.

Despite popular conceptions of the Nullarbor being denuded of vegetation or desert-like, a wide range of flora and fauna are well recorded.

The tableland escarpment is a feature along the Eyre Highway, which sits on the edge of the Roe Plains.
