= Nullarbor (disambiguation) =

Nullarbor (Nullabor is a common misspelling) can refer to:

Places:

- Nullarbor Plain in southern Australia (this includes information about the Nullarbor bioregion)
- Nullarbor, South Australia, a locality

It can also refer to:

- Nullarbor Nymph, an Australian hoax
- Nullarbor (demo party), or the Nullarbor Digital Content Competition, based in Perth, Western Australia

== See also ==
- Nullarbor Links, a golf course in South Australia and Western Australia
- Nullarbor National Park, a protected area in South Australia
- Nullarbor Regional Reserve, a protected area in South Australia
- Nullarbor Wilderness Protection Area, a protected area in South Australia
