= Edward Bate Scott =

Australian explorer and prison official (1822–1909)

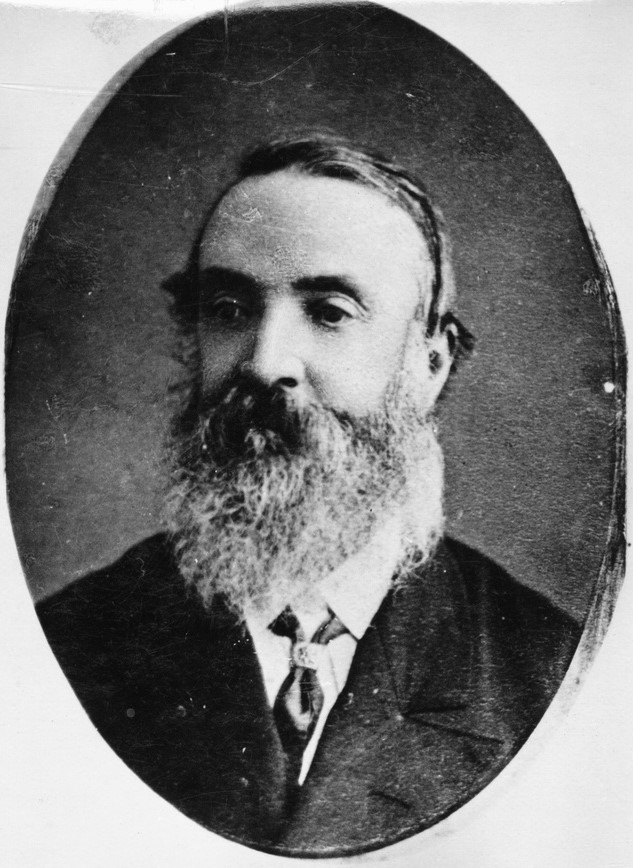

Edward Bate Scott (3 April 1822 – 2 July 1909) was a pioneering colonist of South Australia who accompanied Edward John Eyre on several journeys and had a later career with the South Australian Police Force.

== History ==
E. B. Scott was born in Gillingham, Kent, of a well-to-do family. His father was James Scott, of the Royal Navy. At the age of 16 years, he emigrated on Duke of Edinburgh to New South Wales, where he had a letter of introduction to John Macarthur, alas dead by the time Scott arrived. After a short time in Sydney he joined his brother John Mansel Scott, Master of the Revenue Cutter Ranger, at Port Phillip, then went to a station at Mount Macedon to experience sheep and cattle farming. This did not last long, as the station owner and his family were all drowned in a voyage from Sydney to Port Phillip, and the station was sold. In 1839 he joined his friend George Hamilton (later to be appointed Commissioner of the South Australia Police), droving a herd of cattle from Port Phillip to South Australia for William Mundy and Captain Smythe, reaching Adelaide in 1839.

=== With Edward John Eyre ===
In Adelaide he met Edward John Eyre and Alfred M. Mundy (who became Colonial Secretary in the first South Australian Legislative Council under Governor Grey, and was to marry Jane, the eldest daughter of John Hindmarsh). He was invited to join them in an expedition to Western Australia with sheep and cattle, which were shipped from the North Arm of the Port River to Albany, Western Australia, then drove them overland to Perth. To conserve water most of the travelling was done by night. The trip was highly profitable. Back in Adelaide in 1840, Eyre was organising an expedition to find an overland route to Western Australia, and invited Scott to join him as travelling companion and second in command, sharing in all expenses (apart from a £100 grant from the Government). Eyre wrote in his journal:

"Mr. Scott, who ever since the commencement of our preparations had been most indefatigable and useful in his exertions, was even still more severely tasked on this day. At night, however, we were all amply rewarded by seeing everything completely and satisfactorily arranged; the bustle, confusion, and excitement over; and our drays all loaded and ready to commence on the morrow a journey of which the length, the difficulty, and the result were all a problem yet to be solved."

The party left Government House, Adelaide, on 18 June 1840. Somewhere past Crystal Brook, he wrote:

"My own time, when not personally engaged in conducting the party, was occupied in keeping the journals and charts and in taking observations in the daily register, of the barometer, thermometer, winds, and weather, and in collecting specimens of flowers or minerals. My young friend Mr. Scott was equally busy, for in many of these duties he assisted me, and in some relieved me altogether. ... He was the only sportsman of the party, and upon his gun we were dependent for supplies of wallabies, pigeons, duck, or other game to vary our bill of fare and make the few sheep we had hold out as long as possible. As a companion I could not have made a better selection — young, active, and cheerful— I found him ready to render me all the assistance in his power."

They set up a depot at Mount Arden (north of Quorn), and then Eyre started for the interior, setting out on horseback with one of his Aboriginal assistants and a pack horse to carry provisions, preferring not to subject the others to the difficulties and hazards of exploring unknown country. After 16 days fruitlessly trying to find a way to the interior, he returned. While Eyre was exploring, Scott was in charge of the depot, collected botanical and geological specimens, and took the routine observations three times a day. The party then moved from Mount Arden to Depot Pool, from which point Eyre again struck out for the interior. He followed Mount Deception Range, examining the watercourses, one of which he named the Scott. Failing to find a way to the centre of the continent, Eyre returned to Depot Pool. Here he rested for a time, and then made another attempt by another route. On 21 or 22 August Eyre wrote: — "Not having seen the native for the last two days I thought I might venture to explore the watercourse we were encamped upon, and set off on horseback immediately after breakfast, accompanied by Mr. Scott. ... Having tied up our horses Mr. Scott and I ascended to the top of the high cliff by winding along the ridges at the back of it. From its summit we had an extensive view, and I was enabled to take several angles. One of these high peaks, in the Mount Deception Range, I named the Scott. ... In the course of the morning Mr. Scott shot a rock wallaby of rather a large species, and many more were seen about the high, perpendicular cliffs, under which we had found water." A few days later Eyre found another watercourse, which her named the Mundy. Eyre ascended Mt. Hopeless on 2 September and returned to the base depot.

Abandoning hopes of reaching the centre of the continent from Depot Pool, Eyre made for Streaky Bay, to make his next base depot on the West Coast. Near Port Lincoln they came to a large rocky watercourse with large pools of fresh water. There they had the pleasure of a swim, and Scott shot several ducks; a welcome addition to their diet. On 1 October 1840, they came to a sheep station, owned by Mr. Driver, of which Mr. Dutton was the manager, where they were treated to hospitality. Dutton was to die two years attempting to drove cattle from Port Lincoln to the head of Spencer's Gulf. Eyre and his party proceeded to Port Lincoln, but found the town in a bad way and unable to supply the provisions they required. Scott hired an open boat from Dr. Harvey and with two men sailed her through a gale to Glenelg walked to Adelaide, and reported to Governor Gawler with Eyre's specimen collections, letters and despatches. Gawler placed a cutter, (presumably Water Witch, with its own crew) at his disposal and sailed her back to Port Lincoln with the required stores. Eyre wrote:

"Mr. Scott had managed every thing confided to him admirably, and I felt very greatly indebted to him for the ready and enterprising manner in which he had volunteered to undertake the voyage from Port Lincoln to Adelaide in an open boat, and the successful manner in which he had accomplished it"

They set up their next base at Fowler's Bay. Eyre made several attempts to round the head of the Great Australian Bight. In one attempt three of his horses died. He decided to reduce the size of his party, sending two back to Adelaide in the cutter, leaving Scott, the overseer Baxter, one man and two native assistants. Eyre determined to make one more attempt to get round the head of the Bight. On 29 December 1840 he left the depot with Baxter and one of the natives, leaving the sheep, and four horses in charge of Mr. Scott and the other native. On this occasion Eyre reached the head of the Bight and returned to the depot at Point Fowler on 16 Januarv 16 1841.

Eyre would have liked to send Scott with provisions to set up a forward base at Cape Arid, but Gawler had insisted that the cutter not leave the waters of South Australia, so he set off alone with his two native assistants, and Scott returned to Adelaide. Eyre wrote in his journal:

"It now became my duty to determine, without delay, who were to be my companions in the perilous attempt before me. The first and most painful necessity impressed upon me by the step I contemplated was that of parting with my young friend Mr. Scott, who had been with me from the commencement of the undertaking, and who had always been zealous and active in promoting its interests as far as lay in his power. I knew that, on an occasion like this, the spirit and enterprise of his character would prompt in him a wish to remain and share the difficulties and dangers to which I might be exposed; but I felt that I ought not to allow him to do so. I had no right to lead a young and enthusiastic friend into a peril from which escape seemed to be almost hopeless: and. painful as it would be to us both to separate under such circumstances, there was now no other alternative. ... I took the opportunity, whilst walking down the beach with Mr. Soott, of explaining the circumstances in which I was placed, and the decision to which I had been forced. He was much affected at the intelligence, and would fain have remained to share with me the result of the expedition, whatever that might be, but I dared not consent to it."

Eyre, Baxter, three Aborigines, nine pack horses, a Timor pony and six sheep set off from Fowler's bay on 25 February 1841. After a series of privations which included the murder of Baxter on 29 April and the decamping of two of the natives, Eyre and the third Aborigine, Wylie, arrived at a bay near Esperance, Western Australia, where they met with the French whaler Mississippi and were given hospitality and supplies by Captain Rossiter, then on 7 July arrived at Albany. Eyre had achieved his goal, but at a considerable price.

=== Public servant and pastoralist ===
Scott assisted Lieutenant Pullen in his task of surveying Lake Albert and the Murray mouth, and in 1841 mate on Pullen's boat Water Witch, which he negotiated from Wellington to Moorundie (5 km downstream from Blanchetown) on the River Murray, a distance of about 80 miles (130 km). This journey helped establish Moorundie (often spelled "Moorundee") as the first European settlement on the River Murray in South Australia, and Eyre (who had explored the area in 1839) was appointed there as the Resident Magistrate and Protector of Aborigines.

He assisted Eyre in founding the Government station at Moorundie, which was established by Governor Grey to protect "overlanders" from the hostile attacks of the natives. He assisted Eyre in mapping parts of the River Darling which had been missed by Major Mitchell. He established a cattle station at North West Bend (near the current-day Morgan), but lost money on the project, as did later lessees and owners Philip Levi and Charles H. Armytage. In 1847 he succeeded Eyre at Moorundie as magistrate, Sub-Protector of Aborigines (appointed 1848), inspector of native police, and returning officer. Eyre left for England and never returned to South Australia. Around this time Scott married and started a family. Scott remained at Moorundie until 1857, when the position was abolished by the Government.

In 1856, he took over Moorna station (later occupied by John Crozier), near Wentworth, New South Wales, where in 1858 he lost everything in a fire. They headed inland again, to Ki station, 20 miles (32 km) below Euston, New South Wales, where they worked for three years, but were driven back to Adelaide by drought around 1866.

== Riverboats ==
Scott was a passenger from Wentworth on Bunyip in December 1863 when that boat was destroyed by fire just after she entered the Murray. Two crew members and two passengers died in the flames or were drowned. Scott was conspicuous in the rescue of several passengers.

=== Public servant again ===
He was appointed acting Protector of Aborigines in 1867; in the first 6 months he travelled 2,355 miles (3,790 km) on inspection tours of the 58 depots of this department. and developed outposts for the SA police Force including Overland Corner. In 1869 he was appointed supervisor of the Dry Creek Labor Prison, known as "The Stockade", now Yatala Labour Prison. He resigned October 1892 and was replaced by Robert H. Edmunds (1834 – 12 February 1917). He retired to his home, "Hamilton Lodge", Currency Creek, where he died after a short illness.

== Family ==
- Edward married Celia Williams (died 11 January 1892)

- Heloise May (20 May 1854 – 9 December 1934) married Thomas William Higgins, son of Lieut-Colonel Higgins J.P. in 1874. Lived Burnt Oak Station, Currency Creek.
- Edward Dashwood Scott (9 June 1856 – 16 August 1934) of Hergott Springs
- Beresford George "Berry" Scott (9 December 1857 – ca.1934) of Mount Benson near Kingston SE
- Francis William "Frank" Scott (8 July 1860 – 15 April 1923) of Barrow Creek
- James Hamilton Scott (27 July 1862 7 December 1955) of Hamilton Lodge, Currency Creek
- Richard Henry Ki Scott (27 September 1865 – 1 May 1899)
- John Wynne Scott (28 July 1867 – 3 December 1967)
- Augusta Katherine Winifred (9 October 1970 – 24 May 1904) married Charless Gower Lermitte, M.R.C.S., lived at Gilberton

- His brother George Byng Scott (1824 – 17 February 1886) was Stipendiary Magistrate for Naracoorte, Government Resident of the Northern Territory, acting S.M. for Port Adelaide then Mount Gambier. He was father of George Beresford Scott by his first marriage

== Recognition ==
Several geographic features have been named for E. B. Scott:

- Scott Bay, Scott Point — near Fowler's Bay and
- Scott Creek, Mount Scott — in the North Flinders Ranges near Copley – all named for him by Eyre
- Scott River (Queensland) – named by John McKinlay.

Eyre's expedition was dramatised in the 1962 Australian radio play Edward John Eyre by Colin Thiele.
