= Ctenophorus mckenziei =

Conservation status
- Least Concern (IUCN 3.1)

Scientific classification
- Kingdom: Animalia
- Phylum: Chordata
- Class: Reptilia
- Order: Squamata
- Suborder: Iguania
- Family: Agamidae
- Genus: Ctenophorus
- Species: C. mckenziei

Binomial name
- Ctenophorus mckenziei (Storr, 1981)

Synonyms
- Amphibolurus mckenziei Storr, 1981; Licentia mackenziei — Wells & Wellington, 1985; Ctenophorus mckenziei — Cogger, 2000

Species of lizard

Ctenophorus mckenziei, also commonly known as the dwarf-bicycle dragon and McKenzie's dragon, is a species of endemic Australian lizard within the family Agamidae. Originally named and described as the agamid Amphibolurus mckenziei, the lizard had been identified within the regions of Western Australia and South Australia in which it occupied the shrubbery and woodland areas as its habitat. It was subsequently transferred to the genus Ctenophorus along with other agamid species with which it shared similar morphology and characteristics. The name mckenziei is in reference to Norman Leslie McKenzie, who was a zoologist and discovered the existence of the lizard. Listed on the IUCN red list page, threats to its population numbers are evaluated as least concern; however, its numbers are threatened by habitat loss, climate change, and feral predators.

== Etymology ==
Ctenophorus mckenziei was discovered first by Norman Leslie McKenzie. McKenzie worked for the Department of Conservation and Land Management, Western Australia, and was a zoologist for the Western Australian government as a Research Scientist (1970). The lizard was named after McKenzie who contributed to the research of Ctenophorus mckenziei, as he was a co-collector of the specimens and donor of much other material in the Western Australian Museum.

== Description ==
Ctenophorus mckenziei features

The average total length of the dwarf-bicycle dragon is 6.5 cm (2.6 in), with a snout-to-vent length (SVL) of 31.5–76.5 mm (1.24–3.01 in), and a tail length approximately 230% of this length. It is perceived as having an alternating colour of black and brown on the top of its body, whilst progressively turning paler on the head and accompanied with a series of greyish-white spots, dashes and lines. These lines that appear, form narrow, paravertebral and dorso-lateral stripes from its head to the base of the tail, connected by a series of pale transverse bars. There are some pale upper lateral spots and a pale mid-lateral stripe that extends from the groin to the axilla and partially along the tail. Its underside characteristics include a white colouration, with a singular dark grey patch which is apparent on both the throat and the chest in males. This varies with the females which are densely stippled with a dark grey patch. Around its gular fold on the underside of its neck both males and females have dark ventral markings consisting of broad median stripes extending from its chin to gular fold. Adjacent to this, it has a rhomboidal shaped breast patch that can extend as far as to its groin on the underside of its belly.

In similar nature to other species of Ctenophorus, it's tympanum is visible, indicating it is able to hear. The canthus, or inner corner of its eye, is presented as angular. Its nostril is oval-shaped and faces outwards in a nasal scale that lies just below its canthal ridge. The lizard's bodily stance has an adpressed hindlimb, that is adjacent to the ground. This limb when stretched reaches to around the eye or just beyond. The measurements of this hindlimb indicate it is about 85% of the snout-vent length.

=== Scalation ===
The lizard has dorsal body scalation, with the dorsal scales appearing small and sharply keeled. Similarly, accompanied with this, the scales that appear on the tail and legs are noticeably bigger and more sturdily keeled compared with its dorsal scales. It has a sequence of scales that are enlarged compared to dorsal scalation located on its neck, which are continuous with the vertebral series of enlarged scales that is present. On a skin-fold located on its neck, it has a cluster of smaller spinose scales. The scales that appear on the gular and ventral areas of the lizard are smooth.

== Distribution ==
Ctenophorus mckenziei has been identified and collected from a limited number of locations that are distinguished within two minor regions in Western Australia and South Australia. Originally, during the 1984 Nullarbor survey in South Australia, it was first recorded at two separate sites that were 3–4 km (1.9–2.5 mi) away from each other within the Yalata Indigenous Protected Area (IPA). It was further recorded during the 1987 DEH Biological Survey in the Yellabinna Region at an equally small number of sites just a few kilometres to the east of the IPA. This total of six sites in which the lizard has been found within the IPA, attributed to two in 1984 and another for in 2007–2008, are all within 10–12 kilometres (6.2–7.5 mi) of each other, which justifies the rare status of the lizard. C. mckenziei has also been identified as living within a small area inland from Israelite Bay, Western Australia. Due to inaccessibility to the habitat of the lizard as a result of isolation from major population centres, it restricts visitation and research projects which limits the ability for study and knowledge of this species to expand, thus hypothesising a larger range of habitat within the SA/WA region.

McKenzie's dragon

== Habitat ==
Similar to other endemic Australian cold-blooded reptiles, Ctenophorus mckenziei resides within shrubbery and woodland. The arid nature of South Australia and Western Australia in which it is found provide a stable habitat for the lizard to dwell within. The primary floristic components that make up the habitat it lives in provide an adequate area for the lizard to survive in given its cold-blooded nature as well as the presence of predators that may pose a threat. It is found predominantly within Eucalyptus oleosa (giant mallee), Acacia oswaldii (umbrella wattle) and Acacia papyrocarpa (western myall) over chenopod understorey of Atriplex vesicaria (bladder saltbush), Maireana (bluebush), Rhagodia spinescens and Sclerolaena. This chenopod understorey is common between the populations of the lizard in both Western Australia and South Australia. They also dwell within crusting sandy clay loam as well as under bluebush on non-crusting sandy plains.

== Food sources ==
Studies have shown that the primary prey which Ctenophorus mckenziei may consume as a food source includes ants, in particular small ants of the genus Iridomyrmex, as well as some larger ants of the genera Camponotus and Melophorus. Other variations of prey items that the lizard eats include Hemiptera (true bugs) such as Poecilometis and pentatomids, Coleoptera such as curculionids, Mecoptera, Diptera, Homoptera, Orthoptera, and Hymenoptera. The lizard may also consume the contents of flowers as a source of food.

== Behaviour ==
Similar to other species within its genus, Ctenophorus mckenziei has behavioural patterns that align with territorial disputes. The lizard specifically displays two forms of circumduction as well as two types of head-bob to indicate this occurrence. The circumduction movements directly correspond with both a challenge wave and submissive wave, something described by Brattstrom (1971) in Pogona barbata. The head-bobs differed to this in that the degree to which the head moved was disparate and aided by an extension of the forelimbs. Within this behaviour, a dominant male its head moves a noticeably more extensive distance below and above the regular plane and at a faster rate when compared to a subordinate male or female counterpart. During this movement, males display an agonistic position. When first contacting another C. mckenziei, the lizard displays the head-bob motion as well as the circumduction movements before presenting to each other at a distance of approximately 15 cm. The lizards face in the same direction and continue to head-bob. As this display continues to occur, they coil their tails and perform several hind-leg push-ups, similar to that of the C. decresii. This often leads to physical confrontations between the lizards, inducing biting and violent rolling until one submits and the pair separate.

=== Habitat behaviour ===
In terms of behaviour within its habitat, it utilises the shrubbery such as chenopods to move about within, and primarily use bushes as a means of shelter only. When persistently pursued by predators or by other rival lizards, they move between bush to bush, avoiding the edges and on some occasions diving into the larger bushes for protection. This is in a similar manner to the way in which Ctenophorus isolepis (Military Dragon) and Ctenophorus fordi (Mallee Dragon) use Triodia (hummocks) as a means of escape.

=== Temperature regulation ===
Due to the cold-blooded nature of Ctenophorus mckenziei, they rely on the heat from external sources to maintain their optimal body heat. Studies of the lizard have shown that it maintains its body temperatures between 11.1°C and 43.4°C in thermal gradients provided by external forces such as the sun. There is also an increase in voluntary minimum body temperature during photophase (11.1°C) and scotophase (28.7°C). This may reflect greater activity during the day. Moreover, nocturnal behaviour has been found within the lizard through study of its body temperature, where its maximum voluntary temperature can raise to around 43 degrees Celsius.

== Conservation ==
Ctenophorus mckenziei is listed under the IUCN Red List of Threatened Species as of least concern, with a stable population statistic. Whilst this considers its overall position as a living species, there are still many threats that are apparent against it.

=== Threats ===
General threats to the reptile within its arid grassland habitat include habitat loss from land clearing. The presence of habitat degradation by introduced species such as cattle and rabbits poses another threat to their existence due to the negative outcomes this has. Some habitat modification caused by global climate change has posed threats due to their ectothermic nature, which means that they need ambient environmental temperatures to maintain critical physiological processes that allow for them to reproduce. Further common threats such as death on roads, as well as feral predators such as dogs, cats, pigs and foxes all pose threats to the existence of the Ctenophorus mckenziei.

=== Conservation strategies ===
Due to its status as of least concern and with a stable population, conservation strategies for the protection of this lizard are limited however there are still some ongoing. Conservation strategies like national parks provide adequate protection for the lizard in that they are provided with a habitat that is protected by human intervention without the need for relocation. This is present within the Nullarbor National Park, which is an area where a large population of the lizard lives. Another strategy that is in place is the research of the lizard from a distribution or behavioural standpoint. Studies such as the 1984 Nullarbor survey have allowed researchers to know the rates of occurrence of the lizard so that they may better protect it through interventions such as national parks. Research of the lizards' behavioural patterns may allow for a better understanding of reproduction methods, habitat, and their food sources so that preventing the destruction of these can occur.

== Reproduction ==
Ctenophorus mckenziei reproduces in an oviparous manner. This means it produces eggs, and the young lizards hatch after being expelled from the body. After expulsion from the body, the lizard provides shelter within nests to protect the eggs from predators as they mature and eventually hatch.
