= Mirning =

Aboriginal Australian people

The Mirning, also known as the Ngandatha, are an Aboriginal Australian people whose traditional lands lay on the coastal region of the Great Australian Bight extending from Western Australia into south-west South Australia.

== Name ==
Mirniŋ was their name for 'man'.

== Language ==
Mirning was, properly speaking, a language known as Ngandatha, bearing the sense of "What is it?".

== Country ==
The Mirning's traditional lands covered, according to Norman Tindale, roughly 39,000 square miles (100,000 km^{2}) of territory, reaching from Point Culver (Note: Tindale states 'Port Culver' which appears to be an error or misprint, otherwise unattested, for Matthew Flinders's Point Culver. Tindale's coordinates for the area coincide with those of Point Culver according to the ('Point Culver (32°54'S., 124°42'E.'), and secondly Point Culver is given by W. Graham (NGIA 2004, p. 158)) eastwards across to White Well in South Australia. Their northern limit was generally the ecological line separating them from the beginning of the karst plateau of the Nullarbor Plain, though good rains would see them penetrating further north.

== People and history of contact ==
The Mirning were, according to measurements made of old people from a remnant of the tribe in 1939, relatively short in stature and practice rites of circumcision and subincision. (Note: "The Wonunda speak of the tribes to the north of them as Katabungata and Mooroon, which last word means fat or stout, and of those to the west as Kooraradee, or tall. The reason of this, no doubt, is that the country of the Wonunda Meening is little better than a waterless desert, and its inhabitants, in comparison with their neighbours, half-starved, spare in person, low in stature, who use weapons and implements of an inferior sort". (Graham 1886, p. 394))

The Jirkala-mirning were first contacted by whites in 1872, when their numbers were estimated to be 30, consisting of 11 men, 8 women, 5 adolescents, and 6 children. It was estimated by the first whites who settled in Wonunda-mirnung territory in 1877 that they numbered no more than 80 persons, 15 men, 15 women, 10 adolescents, and some 40 children. Writing in 1931, A. P. Elkin stated: 'The Wanbiri-speaking tribe, referred to as the Yerkla-mining (that is, the men at Yerkla or Irgala) is now extinct.'

== Social organisation ==
The Mirning were organised into groups of which two at least are known.

- Wonunda-mirnung meaning the people of Hampton plateau west of Wonunda, or Eyre's Sand Patch
- Jirkala-mirning meaning the people of Jirkala (modern day Eucla), jirkala referring, according to Tindale, (Note: Williams however writes:'Euclsa, I learn, is a corruption of the aboriginal name of a favourite camping-place called Yircla or Yirgella, a term which signifies morning star, the morning star as it rises over the sandhills being a noticeable object, at the spot, as the Blacks say'. (Williams 1886, p. 400)) to their habitat, which was a treeless plain where Salsola tragus or buckbush thrived.

For ceremonial rites, involving the tribe's adoption of circumcision and subincision, the Wonunda-mirnung and Jirkala-mirning would gather at Jadjuuna, just south of Cocklebiddy.

Their kinship system has four classes: Būdera (root), Būdū (digger), Kūra (dingo) and Wenŭng (wombat). (Note: D. E. Roe of Euclas in Fison and Howitt, 1880 (Fison & Howitt 1880, p. 345))

Alfred William Howitt describes the tribe's marriage system as "very peculiar", in which two classes (Būdera and Kūra) have a privileged position as follows:

Male	Marries	Children are
(M) Būdera	(F) Kūra	(M) Būdera, (F) Kūra
(M) Būdera	(F) Wenŭng	(M) and (F) Būdera
(M) Kūra	(F) Būdera	(M) Kūra, (F) Būdera
(M) Kūra	(F) Būdū	(M) and (F) Kūra
(M) Būdū	(F) Wenŭng	(M) Būdū, (F) Wenŭng
(M) Wenŭng	(F) Būdū	(M) Wenŭng, (F) Būdū

== Heritage damage ==
In December 2022 it was reported that the 30,000 year old artwork lining the Koonalda Cave at Nullarbor, sacred to the Mirning, was severely damaged by vandals who wrote graffiti over part of the surface.

== In film ==
In April 1994 Julian Lennon proposed making a documentary film with the provisional title Eyes of the Soul – Legends of Whales, Dolphins and Tribes, which would have touched on the Mirning's cultural relationship to whales.

A documentary called Whaledreamers – the Gathering, which includes mention of the Mirning, was made in 2006.

== Alternative names ==
- Mining, Meening, Minninng, Mininj
- Ngandatha, Ngandada
- Wanbiri (meaning 'sea coast')
- Warnabirrie
- Wonbil, Wonburi (Kokata exonyms for the Jirkalamirning.)
- Wonunda-meening (wonunda meaning 'low land(ers)' of Eyre/ south of the Hampton cliff scarp clan)
- Wonunda-minung
- Warnabinnie
- Wanmaraing
- Yirkla, Yirkala-Mining, Yerkla-mining
- East Meening/East Mining
- Ikala, Ikula
- Ngadjudjara
- Ngadjuwonga
- Ngadjadjara
- Julbari/Julbara (meaning 'south')
- Ba:duk (meaning 'circumcised/ignorant' for lack of total absorption of rites)

== Some words ==
- mobung (magic)
- doodoo/judoo (wild dog)
- mumma (father) (In the Jirkala-mirning dialect = mummaloo)
- yarkle (mother) (In the Jirkala-mirning dialect = yakaloo)
- wandy-murna (children) (In the Jirkala-mirning dialect = wonderong))

== Sources ==
- "AIATSIS map of Indigenous Australia". AIATSIS. 14 May 2024.
- Elkin, A. P. (September 1931). "The Social Organization of South Australian Tribes". Oceania. 2 (1): 44–73. doi:10.1002/j.1834-4461.1931.tb00022.x. JSTOR 40327353.
- "Eyes of the Soul". heyjules.com.
- Fison, Lorimer; Howitt, Alfred William (1880). Kamilaroi and Kurnai (PDF). Melbourne: G Robinson.
- Graham, W. (1886). "Eyre's Sand Patch: Wonunda Meening Tribe" (PDF). In Curr, Edward Micklethwaite (ed.). The Australian race: its origin, languages, customs, place of landing in Australia and the routes by which it spread itself over the continent. Vol. 1. Melbourne: J. Ferres. pp. 394–299.
- Howitt, Alfred William (1883). "Notes on the Australian Class Systems". Journal of the Anthropological Institute of Great Britain and Ireland. 12: 496–512. doi:10.2307/2841688. JSTOR 2841688.
- Maddox, Lauren (17 April 2007). "Julian Lennon sells stake in Beatles' music". The Houstonian. Archived from the original on 6 December 2014.
- North, West and South Coasts of Australia. ProStar Publications. 2004. ISBN 978-1-577-85655-9.
- Rachwani, Moustafa (21 December 2022). "Ancient Aboriginal rock art destroyed by vandals in 'tragic loss' at sacred SA site". The Guardian.
- Seiler, Elaine (2012). Multi-Dimensional You: Exploring Energetic Evolution. Dog Ear Publishing. ISBN 978-1-457-50629-1.
- "Tindale Tribal Boundaries" (PDF). Department of Aboriginal Affairs, Western Australia. September 2016.
- Tindale, Norman Barnett (1974). "Mirning (WA)". Aboriginal Tribes of Australia: Their Terrain, Environmental Controls, Distribution, Limits, and Proper Names. Australian National University Press. ISBN 978-0-708-10741-6. Archived from the original on 20 March 2020.
- Williams, W. (1886). "Eucla: Yircla Meening Tribe" (PDF). In Curr, Edward Micklethwaite (ed.). The Australian race: its origin, languages, customs, place of landing in Australia and the routes by which it spread itself over the continent. Vol. 1. Melbourne: J. Ferres. pp. 400–407.
- Wright, Tony (15 October 2015). "The whale song man, the oil giant and the Great Australian Bight". The Sydney Morning Herald.
