= Rossiter Bay =

Bight in Western Australia

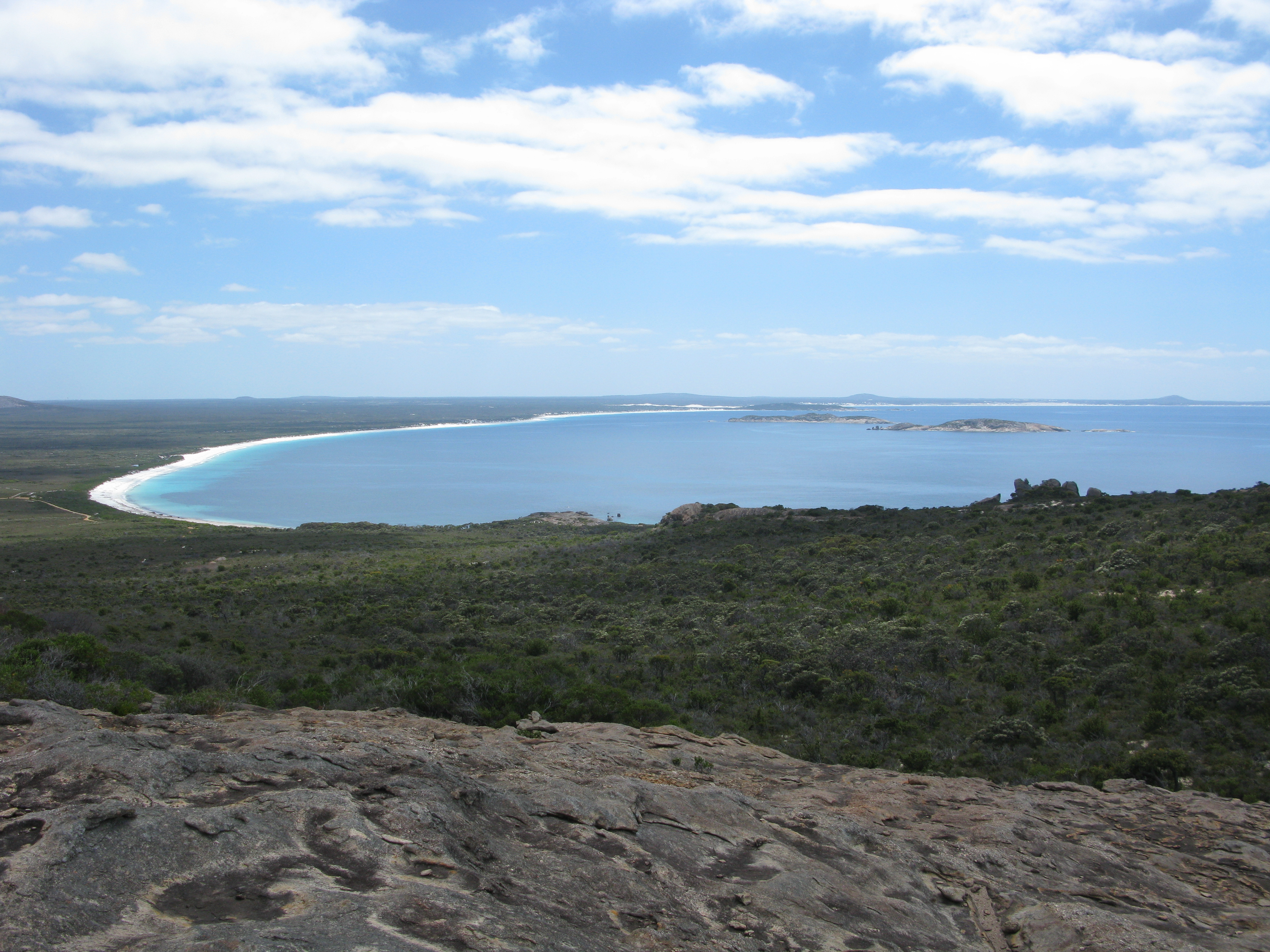
- Rossiter Bay from Mississippi Hill, Cape Le Grand National Park, January 2013.

- Location within Western Australia
- Location: Great Australian Bight
- Coordinates: 33.964°S 122.286°E
- Basin countries: Australia

Rossiter Bay is on the southern coast of Western Australia, in the Cape Le Grand National Park approximately 36 kilometres (22 mi) east of Esperance. The bay is noted as the place that the explorer Edward John Eyre and his Aboriginal companion Wylie met the crew of the French whaling ship Mississippi in June 1841 after they had completed a crossing of the Nullarbor Plain.

It is named for Captain Thomas Rossiter, the Englishman who commanded the Mississippi.

The bay contains a long, curving sandy beach, which is often covered with dry seagrass. To the west lies Lucky Bay, which was named by Matthew Flinders.

The bay is accessible by conventional vehicle along a road ending in a carpark. That point is the trailhead for the Le Grand Coastal Trail. The bay is approximately 69 kilometres (43 mi) by road from Esperance.

== See also ==
- Geography of Western Australia
- Exploration of Australia
