= Koonalda Cave =

Cave in South Australia

- Location within South Australia Location within Australia
- Location: Nullarbor, South Australia
- Coordinates: 31°24′25″S 129°50′10″E
- Discovery: 1935

Koonalda Cave is a cave in the Australian state of South Australia, on the Nullarbor Plain. It is located within the Nullarbor Wilderness Protection Area, 99 kilometres (62 mi) west of the Nullarbor roadhouse and 97 kilometres (60 mi) north east from Eucla, Western Australia. It is notable as an archaeological site.

I.D. Lewis described the cave in 1976 as:

Large doline 60m in diam. and 25m deep; talus slope to two main large passages connected by a high window; total length of cave 1200m; three lakes at -80m; narrow airspace beyond third lake leads to 45m diam. dome and lake; another 30m sump leads off this...

Thousands of square metres in the cave are covered in parallel finger-marked geometric lines and patterns, Aboriginal Australian artwork which has been dated as 20,000 years old.

The cave was abandoned 19,000 years ago, and rediscovered by archaeologists in 1956. Analysis of finger markings and archaeological deposits showed that Aboriginal people used the cave 22,000 years ago.

The cave was explored by an expedition led by Captain J. M. Thompson in 1935. The team entered the cave by a ladder and found themselves in a chamber 244 metres (800 ft) in circumference and walked down tunnels over 366 metres (1,200 ft) in length.

In the 1960s, the cave was excavated by Alexandor Gallus, who found that Aboriginal people had mined flint there.

Koonalda Cave was declared a prohibited area under the South Australian Aboriginal and Historic Relics Preservation Act 1965 on 30 May 1968. It was listed on the South Australian Heritage Register on 4 March 1993 and inscribed onto the Australian National Heritage List on 15 October 2014. It was also listed on the now-defunct Register of the National Estate.

In December 2022, it was reported that some of the artwork was destroyed by vandals who had illegally gained access to the cave at some time since June, prompting calls from the local Mirning people, who consider the site to be sacred, for the state and federal governments to improve security and legal protection for the cave. In March 2023 the Australian Government pledged $400,000 to improve the security of the cave, including the installation of cameras.

== See also ==
- List of sinkholes of Australia
- Warratyi
