= Wilson Bluff, Western and South Australian border =

Cliff in Western and South Australia

Coordinates: 31°41′13″S 129°00′40″E

Location of Wilson Bluff

Wilson Bluff is a coastal cliff on the Australian continental coastline, extending from east of Eucla in Western Australia to south of Border Village in South Australia. It was first recorded in 1885 as Wilson Point, but was Wilson Bluff in volume one of the Australian Pilot 1914–1918 edition. It is reported as being named after "Professor Wilson of Victoria" by E. A. Delisser, a surveyor employed by DeGraves and Co., a pastoral company.

In a 1903 photograph it is identified as being near "Muddie Yarrah" sandhills. It is also known as Yirgila in South Australia.

Within southern Australia, it is located both within the gazetted locality of Nullarbor and within the protected area known as the Nullarbor Wilderness Protection Area, and also overlooks state coastal waters protected by the Great Australian Bight Marine National Park and the Far West Coast Marine Park.

== See also ==
- Bunda Cliffs
