= Edward John Eyre (radio play) =

1962 Australian radio play by Colin Thiele

- Genre: verse drama play
- Running time: 150 mins
- Country of origin: Australia
- Language: English
- Syndicates: ABC
- Written by: Colin Thiele
- Original release: 17 June 1962

Edward John Eyre is a 1962 Australian radio play by Colin Thiele about Edward Eyre. It was written especially for the 1962 Adelaide Festival of the Arts and was much acclaimed.

Thiele had long been interested in the career of Eyre, and had been involved in the unveiling of a plaque commemorating the explorer in 1955.

A copy of the script is at the Fryer Library at the University of Queensland.

== Premise ==
The story of Eyre's 1840 trek around the Great Australian Bight along with John Baxter, Edward Scott and three Aboriginal men.
