= Murrawijinie Cave =

Cave in Australia

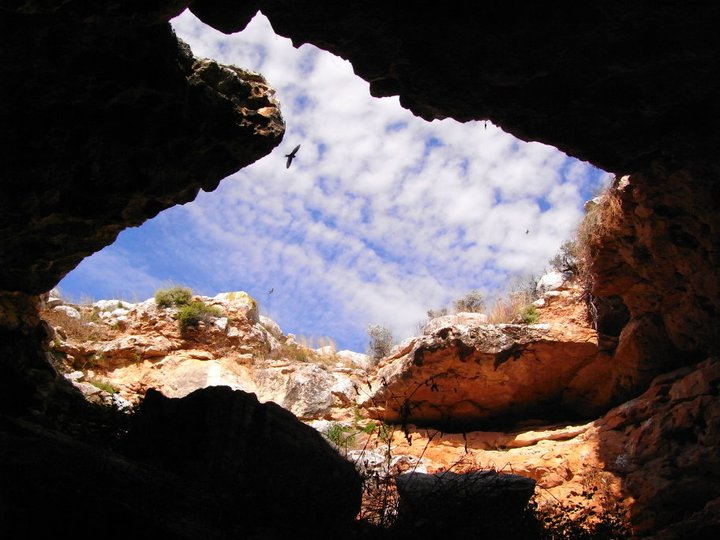
- Murrawijinie Cave

- Location within South Australia
- Location: Nullarbor, South Australia, Australia
- Coordinates: 31°21′52″S 130°52′30″E
- Entrances: 3

Murrawijinie Cave is in the Australian state of South Australia within the gazetted locality of Nullarbor on the Nullarbor Plain.

This cave is open to the public but safety precautions should be taken before driving off the Eyre Highway. The entry is approximately 10 kilometres (6 mi) north of the Nullarbor Roadhouse along a rough track.

Primarily, entry is accessed via doline (sinkhole); another two entrances are close by, which is typical of the Nullarbor's karst topography. Hawks and swallows use the caves as nesting sites.

One of the entrances has hand stencils on the walls drawn in ochre by Indigenous Australians.

Since June 2013, the cave has been in the protected area known as the Nullarbor Wilderness Protection Area.

== See also ==
- Sanctum (film)
- Andrew Wight
