= Yalata Indigenous Protected Area =

- IUCN category V (protected landscape/seascape)
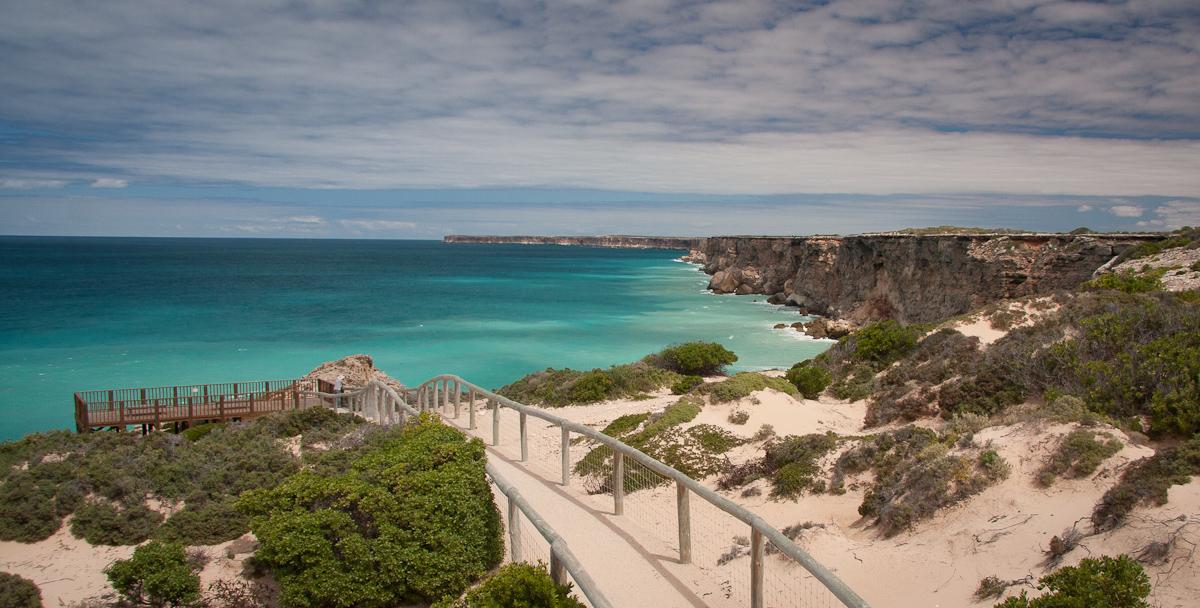
- Whale-watching area above the Bunda Cliffs, west of Head of the Bight

- Location within South Australia
- Location: South Australia
- Nearest city: Yalata, South Australia
- Coordinates: 31°27′S 131°33′E
- Area: 4,643.97 km^{2} (1,793.05 sq mi)
- Established: 1999
- Governing body: Yalata Anangu Aboriginal Corporation

The Yalata Indigenous Protected Area is an Indigenous Protected Area in South Australia. It has an area of 4643.97 km^{2}.

The northern portion of the protected area lies on the arid Nullarbor Plain. The southwestern corner includes a small portion of the Mediterranean-climate Eyre Yorke Block (Eyre and Yorke mallee) ecoregion.

It is bounded on the west by Nullarbor Wilderness Protection Area, on the north by Nullarbor Regional Reserve, on the northeast by Yellabinna Regional Reserve, on the southwest by the Great Australian Bight, and on the southeast by Wahgunyah Conservation Park. The Eyre Highway runs east and west through the protected area.

The protected area includes Head of the Bight, a bay at the northern end of the Great Australian Bight which is a popular spot for whale watching. The dramatic coastal Bunda Cliffs extend westwards from Head of the Bight.
