= Water Witch (1835 cutter) =

Historic shipwreck site

History
- Name: Water Witch
- Builder: John Gray in Hobart Town during 1835.
- Fate: Sunk at mooring in the River Murray at Moorundie, South Australia, 5 December 1842.
- Status: Historic shipwreck.

General characteristics
- Tonnage: 25 tons O.M.
- Length: 35 ft 6 in (10.82 m)
- Beam: 13 ft 6 in (4.11 m)
- Draught: 6 ft 6 in (1.98 m)
- Sail plan: Cutter.

Water Witch was a single-masted vessel rigged as a cutter built during 1835 in Van Diemen's Land and sunk in 1842 whilst moored in the River Murray at Moorundie, south of Blanchetown in South Australia (SA). Her wreck site was discovered in 1982 and received statutory protection as a historic shipwreck in 1983. The wreck site was the subject of an underwater survey in March 1984. She was the first European vessel to enter the River Murray via its mouth, her role in the charting of the lower reaches of the River Murray including Lake Alexandrina whilst under the command of William Pullen and her association with Edward John Eyre.

== Origins ==
Water Witch was built at Hobart Town, Van Diemen's Land by John Gray during 1835.

== Career ==
The vessel was originally built for George Watson and James Smith. She was subsequently owned by Richard Griffiths (1836), William Parcell (1837) and Thomas Strangways (1839). In 1839, she was purchased by the South Australian Government to replace the brig Rapid (which was part of the First Fleet of South Australia in 1836)

After short career in Tasmania, she was brought to South Australia by Parcell. Her duties involved voyages to Thistle Island in Spencer Gulf; Sydney; Portland and Port Phillip in Victoria. Under the ownership of Strangways, she worked in Encounter Bay. As a South Australian government vessel, she was initially engaged with the charting the lower channels of the River Murray and Lake Alexandrina under the command of William Pullen.

During April 1840, she accompanied the brig Porter which was conveying Governor Gawler to Port Lincoln, where he explored the east coast of Eyre Peninsula in the company of John Hill. In May 1840 she conveyed Hill to Point Riley, from where he reportedly made the first European crossing, on horseback, of Northern Yorke Peninsula.

From June 1840 to January 1841, she supplied Eyre’s expedition at locations such as the head of Spencer Gulf, Streaky Bay and Fowlers Bay. In 1841, her range was restricted to Gulf St Vincent due to her leaky condition. On Pullen's suggestion, she was sent to Encounter Bay where on 8 May 1841, she became the first European vessel to successfully enter the River Murray mouth. E. B. Scott, a friend of Eyre, who had assisted Pullen in his task of surveying Lake Albert acted as mate, and negotiated her from Wellington to Moorundie (some 5 km downstream from present-day Blanchetown). This journey helped establish Moorundie (often spelled "Moorundee") as the first European settlement on the River Murray in South Australia. On 3 July 1841, Water Witch was offered for sale at Goolwa. By March 1842, she was located at Moorundie, where Eyre (who had explored the area in 1839) was serving as the Protector of Aborigines and the Resident Magistrate.

== Sinking ==
She sunk at her mooring at Moorundie during a storm on 5 December 1842. The loss was attributed to the vessel being in "poor repair". Her loss was reported by Eyre.

== Discovery and survey of wreck site ==
During 1970, a group of recreational divers under the direction of Robert Sexton, an amateur maritime historian, unsuccessfully searched for the wreck site at Moorundie. In 1981, the Society for Underwater Historical Research (SUHR) conducted desktop research followed by underwater searches also without any success. Later in 1982, the SUHR revisited the problem after the discovery of a drawing prepared by Edward Charles Frome in March 1842 showing a vessel moored at Moorundie. The depicted vessel was considered to Water Witch on the basis of research showing that she was the only vessel known to have sailed on the River Murray at the time. In August 1982, the location of the scene drawn by Frome was confirmed on site and a subsequent underwater search of the mooring location revealed a mound of ballast, loose timber and other artefacts.

In March 1984, a project to survey and partially excavate the wreck site was carried out by the Department of Environment and Planning and the SUHR with assistance from the SA Police STAR Force Dive Section. The underwater survey work was carried in total darkness using diver communications system incorporated in full face diving masks. The project received grant funding as part of the celebration of the sesquicentenary (150th anniversary) of European settlement in South Australia in 1986.

A subsequent analysis of materials recovered from the wreck site positively identified the site as being the remains of Water Witch.

== The present day ==
The majority of the wreckage remains on the river bed covered with sand bags and the vessel's ballast. The site was declared a historic shipwreck under the Historic Shipwrecks Act 1981 (SA) during April 1983. The wreck site is officially located at 34°24′0″S 139°37′12″E. Water Witch is also remembered in the naming of two features in the coastal waters of South Australia - the Water Witch Channel located in Smoky Bay west of the town of Smoky Bay and Water Witch Bay located near Port Pirie.

== See also ==
- List of shipwrecks of Australia
- List of shipwrecks in 1842
- Mount Hill, South Australia
- Thomas Burr
