= George Hamilton (Australian police officer) =

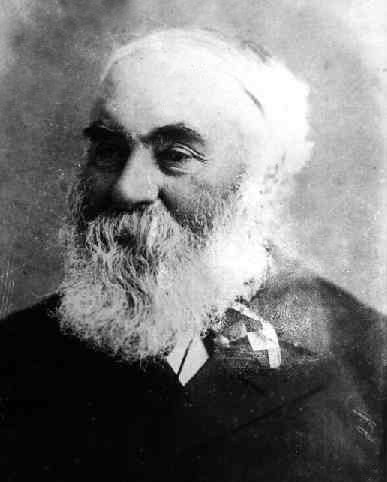
- Born: George Hamilton; 12 March 1812; Herefordshire, England
- Died: 2 August 1883 (aged 71)
- Resting place: West Terrace Cemetery
- Education: Harrow School
- Occupation: Commissioner of police
- Years active: 1867–1881
- Employer: South Australia Police
- Organization: Colony of South Australia
- Known for: Artist, author, Animal activist
- Title: Commissioner of Police
- Partner: Unmarried

George Hamilton (12 March 1812 – 2 August 1883), was a pioneer overlander, artist, settler, and police officer in the Colony of South Australia, serving as Commissioner of Police for fifteen years.

== Origins ==
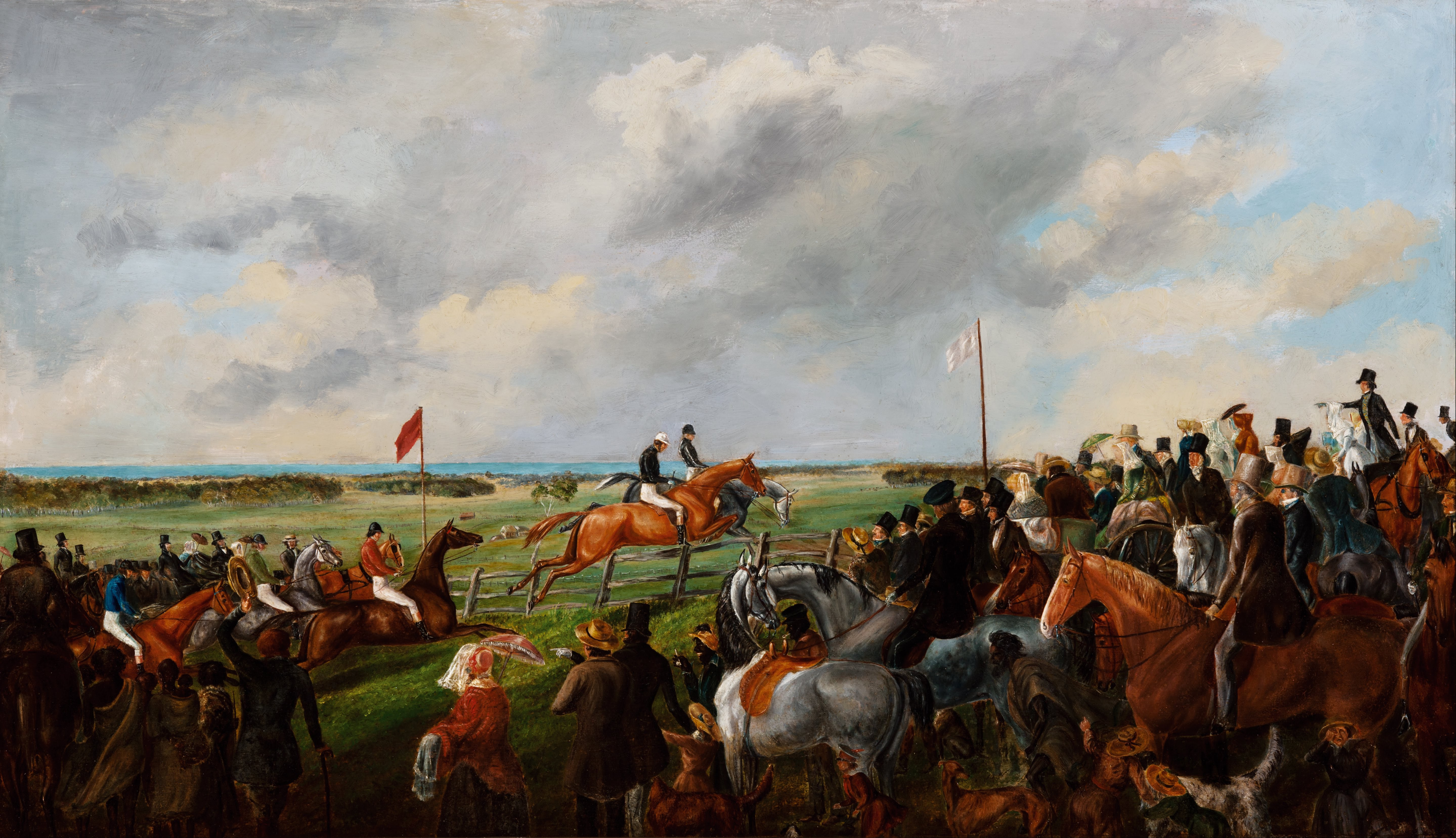
The first steeplechase in South Australia, 25 September 1846 painted by George Hamilton. All the faces are said to be portraits.

Hamilton came from an old Herefordshire family and as a youth was educated at Harrow School before serving as midshipman in the Royal Navy. Farming was his major interest when he emigrated to Australia, firstly to Sydney, before overlanding sheep to Port Phillip, Victoria in March, 1837. He was the first European to settle on the future townsite of Gisborne, Victoria on about 24 March 1837. He then participated in overlanding a herd of cattle for Lt Alfred Mundy and Captain George Brunswick Smyth from Pyalong, Victoria to Adelaide in October 1839, along with close friend E.B. Scott. For the next few years he combined mixed farming along with his artistic talents, both visual arts and authorship, all of which had considerable merit, but none of which were a resounding success.

In 1848 he accepted a position as clerk with the Colonial Treasury and, when the Gold Escorts from the Victorian Goldfields were established, he transferred in May 1852 to become Bullion Clerk in the busy Gold Escort Office.

== Early Police career ==
On 1 December 1853 he joined the South Australian Mounted Police with the rank of Inspector, at the invitation of Alexander Tolmer, who around the time had been demoted from Commissioner of Police to Chief Inspector.

He progressed gradually through the ranks. Around 1860 he was appointed Chief Inspector and also acted in the position of Commissioner on occasion. During this period he was an activist for the humane treatment of horses, publishing two significant books on that topic, these early endeavours in the prevention of animal cruelty now being recognised at the National Museum of Australia.

On 14 November 1867, aged 55 years, he was appointed Commissioner of Police, succeeding Major Peter Warburton, who had been asked to resign. Inspector William Searcy was promoted to Hamilton's former position of Chief Inspector.

== Commissioner of Police ==
Hamilton had already served twenty years in the force when he was appointed, and so he was well familiar with its policies and politics. He was destined to preside over a period of solid growth and reorganisation, restoring the reputation of the force from one of disorganisation. He was involved in advising and fitting out a number of government and private exploration parties. Hamilton was a noted horseman, and placed great importance on mounted constabulary during his time as Commissioner, which made a career with the police an attractive choice for bright adventurous young men. He was a stern disciplinarian and developed the police force into a well-drilled and efficient service. He never failed to punish infractions, nor to give credit for good work.

He was not only a great supporter of the artistic merits of photography, but could also see its benefit in police investigations. In the late 1860s he introduced the science of photography to the South Australia Police, appointing Detective Von Der Borch as its official photographer. This was followed in 1880 by his introduction of the scientific analysis of handwriting, appointing Detective Peter Webster as the first handwriting expert.

In 1881 he took one year's leave of absence prior to resignation, and was replaced by W. J. Peterswald. From the day he first set foot in Australia he never left the country.

He was closely associated with the vice-regal staff, acting as aide-de-camp on occasion and at the time of his death was serving as extra aide-de-camp of Sir William Robinson. Lake Hamilton on Eyre Peninsula bears his name.

== Artistic and Literary Interests ==
Hamilton's published writings include poetry, essays, verse, and reminiscences. His drawings were often imbued with a somewhat whimsical characterisation. He became something of an authority on art, and was a keen amateur artist. Penman and Galbraith published a collection of his lithographs depicting conflict between European and Aboriginal people. It was reported in 1883 that he had purchased, for £2,000, William Strutt's 1864 painting "Black Thursday" for permanent loan to the South Australian Art Gallery, although this sale may not have been finalised. He was foremost in the foundation of the Adelaide Club, and actually resided there in his retirement. He was an active member of the Acclimatization and Zoological Society.

== Family ==
Hamilton never married and in later years lived at the Adelaide Club. Members of his extended family served with distinction in the British Army over several generations, some being elevated to the peerage. He was an elder brother of Maj. Gen. Henry Meade Hamilton, CB, (Crimea, New Zealand, Natal), whose sons included Col. Gilbert Henry Claude Hamilton, CB, General Sir Bruce Meade Hamilton, GCB, KCB, KCVO., and Major General Hubert Ion Wetherall Hamilton, CB, CVO, DSO. His other brothers were Dr. Hamilton, of London, and Colonel Dugdale Hamilton with the British Army in India.

== Published works ==
Hamilton wrote under his own name as well as the pseudonyms John Newcome and An Old Hand. His published works, some of which are illustrated with his own drawings, include:

- The Horse : Its Treatment in Australia, with Illustrations (1864)
- An Appeal for the Horse (1866)
- Experiences of a Colonist Forty Years Ago, etc. (1879)
- Fugitive pieces in prose and verse (187?)

Engravings of his drawings were also published in:

- Eyre, Edward John : Journal of Discovery into Central Australia
- Grey, George : Journals of two expeditions of discovery in north-west and Western Australia, etc
