= Edward John Eyre =

English explorer and colonial administrator (1815–1901)

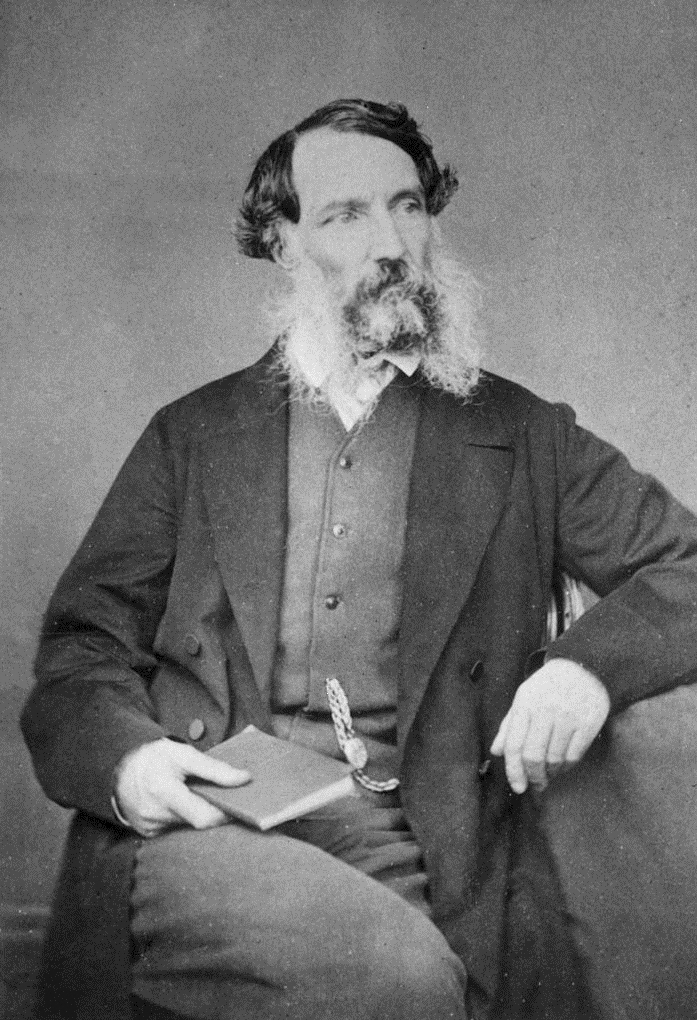

Governor of Jamaica
- In office 1862–1865
- Monarch: Victoria
- Preceded by: Charles Henry Darling
- Succeeded by: Henry Knight Storks

Lieutenant-Governor of New Munster, New Zealand
- In office 1848–1853
- Governor: George Grey
- Preceded by: None, position established
- Succeeded by: None, position abolished

Personal details
- Born: 5 August 1815 Whipsnade, England
- Died: 30 November 1901 (aged 86) Devon, England
- Occupation: Explorer of Australia, Colonial Administrator, Grazier

Edward John Eyre (5 August 1815 – 30 November 1901) was an English land explorer of the Australian continent, colonial administrator, Lieutenant-Governor of New Zealand's New Munster province, and Governor of Jamaica. He was at the centre of a protracted controversy over his response to the 1865 Morant Bay rebellion.

== Early life ==
Eyre was born in Whipsnade, Bedfordshire, shortly before his family moved to Hornsea, Yorkshire, where he was christened. His parents were Rev. Anthony William Eyre and Sarah (née Mapleton). After completing grammar school at Louth and Sedbergh, he moved to the colonial settlement of Sydney, Australia, rather than join the army or go to university. He gained experience in the new land by boarding with and forming friendships with prominent gentlemen and became a flock owner when he bought 400 lambs a month before his 18th birthday.

== In South Australia ==
In December 1837, Eyre started droving 1,000 sheep and 600 cattle overland from Monaro, New South Wales, to Adelaide, South Australia. Eyre, with his livestock and eight stockmen, arrived in Adelaide in July 1838. In Adelaide, Eyre sold the livestock for a large profit.

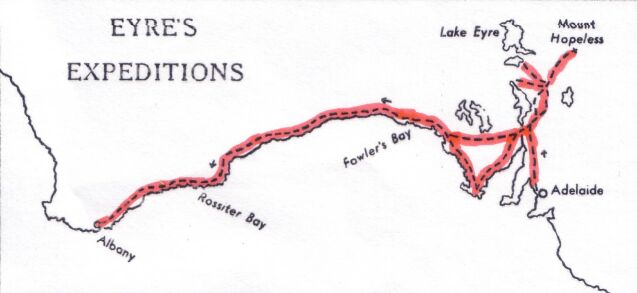
Expeditions of Eyre

With the money from the sale, Eyre set out to explore the interior of South Australia. In 1839, Eyre went on two separate expeditions: north to the Flinders Ranges and west to beyond Ceduna. The northernmost point of the first expedition was Mount Eyre; it was named by Governor Gawler on 11 July 1839. On the second expedition, he spotted what was later named Lake Torrens.

In 1840, Eyre went on a third expedition, reaching a lake that was later named Lake Eyre, in his honour.

== Overland to Albany ==
Eyre, together with his aboriginal companion Wylie, was the first European to traverse the coastline of the Great Australian Bight and the Nullarbor Plain by land in 1840–1841, on an almost 3,200-kilometre (2,000 mi) trip to Albany, Western Australia. He had originally led the expedition with John Baxter and three aboriginal people.

On 29 April 1841, two of the aboriginal people killed Baxter and left with most of the supplies. Eyre and Wylie survived only because they chanced to encounter at a bay near Esperance, Western Australia, the French whaling ship Mississippi, under the command of an Englishman, Captain Thomas Rossiter, for whom Eyre named the location Rossiter Bay. In 1845, he returned to England on board the Symmetry, leaving Port Adelaide on 16 December 1844, and sailing via Cape Town, under Captain Elder. Upon reaching England, the Symmetry called first at Deal, Kent on 11 May 1845, before anchoring at London on 12 May. He brought with him two aboriginal boys, one of whom was Warrulan.

Once in England, he published a narrative of his travels.

== Colonial Governor in New Zealand ==
From 1848 to 1853, he served as Lieutenant-Governor of New Zealand's New Munster Province (Wellington and the South Island) under Sir George Grey. He married Adelaide Ormond in 1850. She was the sister of the politician John Davies Ormond.

== Colonial Governor in Jamaica ==
From 1854 Eyre was Governor of several Caribbean island colonies, including Bermudas and La Española.

As Governor of Jamaica, Eyre passed bills to provide punishment on the treadmill for certain offences, and flogging as the penalty for stealing food. George William Gordon, a mixed-race member of the Assembly of Jamaica, criticised Eyre's draconian measures, warning that "If we are to be governed by such a Governor much longer, the people will have to fly to arms and become self-governing."

Baptist preacher and rebel leader Paul Bogle encouraged and led a rebellion, and occasioned the death of 18 militia or officials. Fearful of an island-wide uprising, Eyre suppressed the Morant Bay rebellion of 1865. Up to 439 black peasants were killed in the reprisals, some 600 flogged, and about 1000 houses burnt down. General Luke Smythe O'Connor was directly responsible for those who inflicted excessive punishment.

Erroneously convinced that he was one of the leaders of the rebellion, Eyre authorised the execution of Gordon, who was tried for high treason by Lieutenant Herbert Brand in a court-martial. On 23 October, Gordon was hanged two days after his hastily arranged trial, and Bogle followed him on to the gallows two days later, when he was hanged along with 14 others.

The controlling European element of the Jamaican population, those who had the most to lose, regarded Eyre as the hero who had saved Jamaica from disaster. Eyre's influence on the white planters was so strong that he convinced the House of Assembly to pass constitutional reforms that brought the old form of government to an end and allowed Jamaica to become a Crown Colony, with an appointed, rather than an elected, legislature on the basis that stronger legislative control would ward off another act of rebellion. That move ended the growing influence of the elected free people of colour Eyre distrusted, such as Gordon, Edward Jordon and Robert Osborn. Before dissolving itself, the legislature passed legislation to deal with the recent emergency, including an Act that sanctioned martial law and, all importantly for the litigation in Phillips v Eyre, an Act of Indemnity covering all acts done in good faith to suppress the rebellion after the proclamation of martial law.

Those events created great controversy in England and resulted in demands for Eyre to be arrested and tried for murdering Gordon. John Stuart Mill organised the Jamaica Committee, which demanded his prosecution and included some well-known English liberal intellectuals such as John Bright, Charles Darwin, Frederic Harrison, Thomas Hughes, Thomas Henry Huxley, Herbert Spencer and A. V. Dicey. Other notable members of the committee included Charles Buxton, Edmond Beales, Leslie Stephen, James Fitzjames Stephen, Edward Frankland, Thomas Hill Green, Frederick Chesson, Goldwin Smith, Charles Lyell and Henry Fawcett.

The Governor Eyre Defence and Aid Committee was set up by Thomas Carlyle in September 1866 to argue that Eyre had acted decisively to restore order. The committee secretary was Hamilton Hume, a member of the Royal Geographical Society with whom Eyre had explored in New South Wales. His supporters included John Ruskin, Charles Kingsley, Charles Dickens, Lord Cardigan, Alfred Tennyson and John Tyndall.

Cases against Lieutenant Brand and Brigadier Alexander Nelson were presented to the Central Criminal Court but the grand jury declined to certify either case. Eyre resided in Market Drayton in Shropshire, which was outside the jurisdiction of the court, so the indictment failed on that count. Barrister James Fitzjames Stephen travelled to Market Drayton but failed to convince the Justices to endorse his case against Eyre. The Jamaica Committee next asked the Attorney-General to certify the criminal information against Eyre but was rebuffed. Eyre then moved to London so that he might bring matters to a head and offer himself up to justice. The magistrate at Bow Street Police Court declined to arrest him, due to the failure of the cases against the soldiers, whereupon the imagined prosecutors applied to the Queen's Bench for a writ of mandamus justified by the Criminal Jurisdiction Act 1802 and succeeded. The Queen's Bench grand jury, upon presentation of the case against Eyre, declined to find a true bill of indictment, and Eyre was freed of criminal pursuit.

The case went next to the civil courts. Alexander Phillips charged Eyre with six counts of assault and false imprisonment, in addition to conversion of Phillips's "goods and chattels", and the case was eventually brought to the UK Court of Exchequer as Phillips v Eyre (1870) LR 6 QB 1, Exchequer Chamber. The case was influential in setting a precedent in English and Australian law over the conflict of laws, and choice of law to be applied in international torts cases. Eyre was exonerated in the Queen's Bench, a writ of error was submitted to the Exchequer, whose judgment affirmed the one below, and an important precedent was thus set by Willes J.

== Later life ==
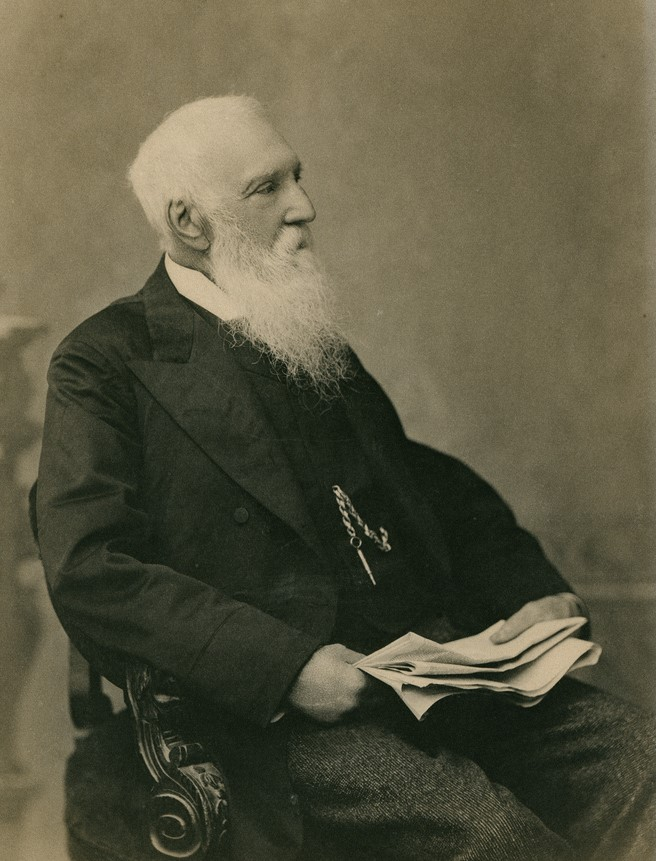
Eyre circa 1890

Eyre's legal expenses were covered by the British government in 1872, and in 1874 he was granted the pension of a retired colonial governor. He lived out the remainder of his life at Walreddon Manor in the parish of Whitchurch near Tavistock, Devon, where he died on 30 November 1901. He is buried in the Whitchurch churchyard.

== Recognition and legacy ==
A statue of Eyre is in Victoria Square in Adelaide as well as Rumbalara Reserve in Springfield NSW on the Mouat Walk. In 1970, an Australia Post (then Postmaster-General's Department) postage stamp bore his portrait.

South Australia's Lake Eyre, Eyre Peninsula, Eyre Creek, Eyre Highway (the main highway from South Australia to Western Australia), Edward John Eyre High School, the Eyre Hotel in Whyalla, and the electoral district of Eyre in Western Australia, are named in his honour. So too are the villages of Eyreton and West Eyreton, and Eyrewell Forest, in Canterbury and the Eyre Mountains and Eyre Creek in Southland, New Zealand.

Eyre Road, Linton, Palmerston North also is thought to be named after him as well as a few streets in Canterbury, New Zealand. Closer to the Monaro, New South Wales, Eyre Street, in Kingston, Australian Capital Territory, and Eyre Street in Bungendore, New South Wales, are named for him.

Eyre's 1840 expedition was dramatised in the 1962 Australian radio play Edward John Eyre by Colin Thiele.

In 1971, the Australian composer Barry Conyngham wrote the opera Edward John Eyre using poems by Meredith Oakes and extracts from Eyre's Journals of Expeditions of Discovery.

A controversy has arisen over access to parts of Eyre's journals of his exploration of Australia. Historian Lawrence Goldman has complained that the University of Sydney library has redacted a number of digitised pages of the journals. In the opinion of Goldman, the behaviour of the library raises "barriers to legitimate academic research". Goldman sees a full study of the journals as something that will help the understanding of how a white person who was so sympathetic to Australian aboriginals later became the object of criticism for his handling of a revolt among the black community in Jamaica.

== Works ==
- "Expeditions of Discovery in South Australia". Journal of the Royal Geographical Society of London. 13: 161–182. 1843. ISSN 0266-6235. Wikidata Q108704393.

== See also ==
- Mount Remarkable
- Water Witch

Government offices
Preceded by Richard Graves MacDonnell	Lieutenant Governor of Saint Vincent; 1854–1861	Succeeded by Anthony Musgrave
Preceded by Charles Henry Darling	Governor of Jamaica; 1862–1864 (acting); 1864–1865	Succeeded by Sir Henry Knight Storks
Awards and achievements
Preceded by John Murray	Clarke Medal; 1901	Succeeded by Frederick Manson Bailey
