= John Baxter (explorer) =

Australian explorer (1799–1841)

- Born: 1799; Comber, County Down, Ireland
- Died: 29 April 1841 (aged 41–42); Caiguna, Western Australia, Australia
- Occupations: farm bailiff, overlander, explorer

John Baxter (1799 – 29 April 1841) was an Irish convict who became an Australian pioneer, overlander, explorer, and offsider of explorer Edward John Eyre.

== Origins ==
Baxter was born in 1799 at Comber, County Down, Ireland, a son of mariner James Baxter. Raised in a Protestant family, the powerfully built young man, who was educated to read and write, became a farm bailiff at Down.

In 1826 Baxter was convicted for having received a stolen brooch, and was sentenced to seven years' penal transportation, to be served in New South Wales. He arrived in Sydney aboard the Countess of Harcourt.

== N.S.W. convict ==
Baxter was promptly assigned as a farm labourer for free settlers, initially for William Bell in the Hunter Valley, and then other settlers. Through good conduct he obtained his ticket of leave in 1831 while working at Patrick's Plains on the Hunter River. On 19 August 1833 he was granted his Certificate of Freedom.

That same month the 33-year-old ruddy-faced Baxter was one of six freed ex-convicts assigned to work (with wages and keep) for 18-year-old novice settler Edward John Eyre at his newly established Hunter River property. Baxter was reputedly married, but his wife died in 1837. At this period Eyre described Baxter as "a good cooper and rough carpenter, and ... a most useful, well-behaved man", despite his roughness and occasional alcohol binges.

== Explorer and companion of Eyre ==
For the next eight years Baxter was to accompany Eyre through nearly every one of his pastoralist, livestock overlanding, and exploration endeavours, most usually as his faithful overseer and best friend, but sometimes as a partner. For example, Baxter brought 60 head of his own cattle in the herd that he and Eyre overlanded to Adelaide, arriving July 1838. In 1840 Baxter and Eyre were equal minority shareholders in the special survey that led to settlement of the Clare Valley, holding adjacent sections of land.

Although Baxter lacked Eyre's higher education and sophistication, it could be said that wherever Eyre explored, so also did Baxter. In threatening situations, particularly with potentially hostile Aboriginals, the older and well-built Baxter often provided the strong physical presence which the tall but slightly-built Eyre lacked. In addition, Baxter sometimes scouted and explored districts that Eyre didn't actually visit, but nevertheless reported on, he being expedition leader.

During their 1839 exploration of Eyre Peninsula, Baxter found a water source near a range of hills he had visited, which Eyre then named Baxter's Range. The range, which is sited west of Port Augusta, is today named Baxter Range, with parts being called Corunna Hills. The Baxter Detention Centre which operated near here 2002-07 therefore had the irony of being named after a former convict.

== Death ==
In 1841 Eyre led the first expedition to cross the Nullarbor Plain, east to west, with Baxter as his overseer. The small party reached Eucla, at the head of the Bight, on 11 March 1841. Heading further west, the harsh terrain became even more arid.

On the night of 29 April 1841, when the exploration party was low on supplies and in desperate need of water, near the coast south of present-day Caiguna in Nuytsland National Park, Baxter was murdered by Yarry and Joey, two of the Indigenous Australians with the group, who took guns and supplies, leaving only Eyre and the Aboriginal Wylie to complete the journey. Eyre had been checking their horses at 10.30pm when Baxter, who had been asleep in his swag, was shot in the chest by a rifle when he aroused and attempted to foil the deserters and their plot.

The expedition was at or past the point of no return and morale was low. Eyre and Wylie were fortunate to survive the journey to Albany.

== Baxter's grave and memorial ==
Eyre and Wylie were unable to dig a grave for Baxter because of sheet rock in that locality. His body was left wrapped in a blanket. In the late 1920s the Western Australian Historical Society organised an expedition to locate Baxter's remains. His scattered bones were discovered approximately 3 kilometres (1.9 mi) from the coastal cliffs. Those cliffs are officially named the Baxter Cliffs. Baxter's memorial is a concrete pillar erected in 1930 with a brass plaque reading "John Baxter, (explorer), The Companion Of, John Edward Eyre, Was Killed Here By Natives, April 29th 1841".

The memorial can be accessed by 4-wheel-drive from Caiguna road house. It is approximately 35 kilometres (22 mi) to Baxter's memorial and a further 5 kilometres (3.1 mi) to Baxter's Lookout (cliffs). The landscape is flat and vegetation stunted. An overnight stay at Baxter's Lookout gives a feel for the expedition's predicament.

Eyre's expedition was dramatised in the 1962 Australian radio play Edward John Eyre by Colin Thiele.
