= Nullarbor Nymph =

Australian hoax

The Nullarbor Nymph was a hoax perpetrated in Australia between 1971 and 1972 that involved supposed sightings of a half-naked woman living amongst kangaroos on the Nullarbor Plain.

== Events ==
The first report on 26 December 1971 was by professional kangaroo shooters from Eucla in Western Australia, near the border with South Australia. They claimed to have seen a blonde, white woman amongst some kangaroos, and backed their story with grainy amateur film showing a woman wearing kangaroo skins and holding a kangaroo by the tail. After further sightings were claimed, the story was reported around the world, and journalists descended upon the town of Eucla which had a population of 8 people at the time.

== Unveiling of the hoax ==
The incident was eventually revealed as a hoax, initiated as a publicity stunt. The girl on the film turned out to be a 17-year-old model named Janice Beeby. She did appear in a photograph taken later, as an evidence of the Nullarbor Nymph, but the woman in the original photograph used by the media to disseminate the hoax was Geneice Brooker, the partner of Laurie Scott, one of the kangaroo-shooter hoaxers. Scott admitted to Murray Nicoll of The News that the hoax was created by a publicist Geoff Pearce, of Melbourne, who happened to be in the Eucla Hotel and had contacts within the media.

== Influence ==
Nullarbor Nymph sculptures by Dora Dallwitz were shown in 1994 at an exhibition held for students graduating from their Master of Visual Arts degree in Sculpture, and in 2000 and 2004 at Top Floor Gallery in Adelaide. Her main sculpture After the Nullarbor Nymph, which was cast into bronze, was exhibited in front of the South Australian Museum for three months, was selected in the 2004 Sculpture by the Sea exhibition in Sydney, and is now on display in front of the Flinders Medical Centre in Adelaide.

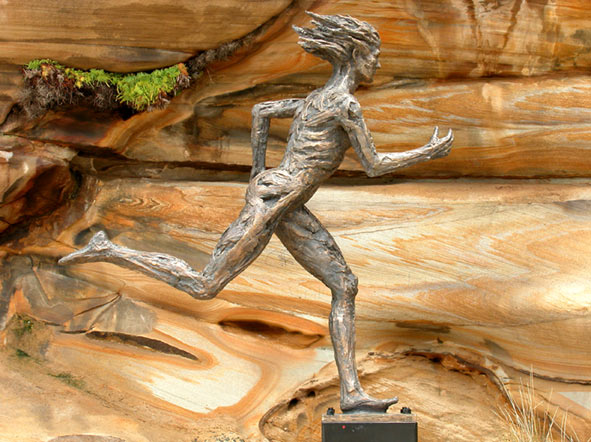
Sculpture by Dora Dallwitz titled After the Nullarbor Nymph installed at Sculpture by the Sea event 2004, Tamarama Beach

In 1994 an installation at the Australian National Gallery referred to the myth. The issue is raised as an urban myth periodically.

In 2012 a low-budget movie titled The Nullarbor Nymph was produced out of Ceduna, South Australia and written and directed by Mathew J. Wilkinson. The mockumentary depicts the Nymph as tormenting men who travel across the Nullarbor. The film premiered in Ceduna on 3 March 2012 and then across Australia in following months. The film received much hype thanks to radio announcer Merrick Watts of Triple M's Merrick and The Highway Patrol show which aired across Australia. A Sydney premiere was held on 22 May 2012 and the film received positive reviews given its $25,000 budget.

== See also ==
- Feral child
- List of hoaxes
