= E. A. Delisser =

Australian surveyor

Edmund A. Delisser (1829 – July 1900) was an Australian surveyor who first named the Nullarbor Plain in 1866 when travelling between Fowler's Bay and Eucla.

== South Australia ==
In 1865 he had been employed by the pastoral company DeGraves and Co. to sink wells and explore country north-west of Fowlers Bay and the Head of the Bight area.

In June 1865 he went from the Kudna rock hole to the northern edge of the Nullarbor after six days of travelling.

In August 1866 he subsequently followed the Aboriginal paths that went between the Head of the Bight and Eucla. It was on this trip that he became the first European to use the name Nullarbor.

The Delisser Sandhills near Eucla are named after him.

== Earlier career ==
He had been enlisted as Lieutenant in the 78th Highlanders in Aden.

== Later career ==
In the 1870s and 1880s he moved to Queensland, where his brother Alfred was also a surveyor. They had worked together in South Australia, as a map from 1861 attests.

In Queensland he had been involved in surveys for the Townsville–Charters Towers railway line (1878-1881), as well as Gladstone–Bundaberg (1884-1888), and following that he was involved with the Walter Hodgson mine, which was located on Butcher's Creek some 35 miles outside of Cairns.

In 1900, he died at the age of 71 near Cairns, Queensland.

== See also ==
- Wilson Bluff, Western and South Australian border
