= Nullarbor, South Australia =

Nullarbor
- Town
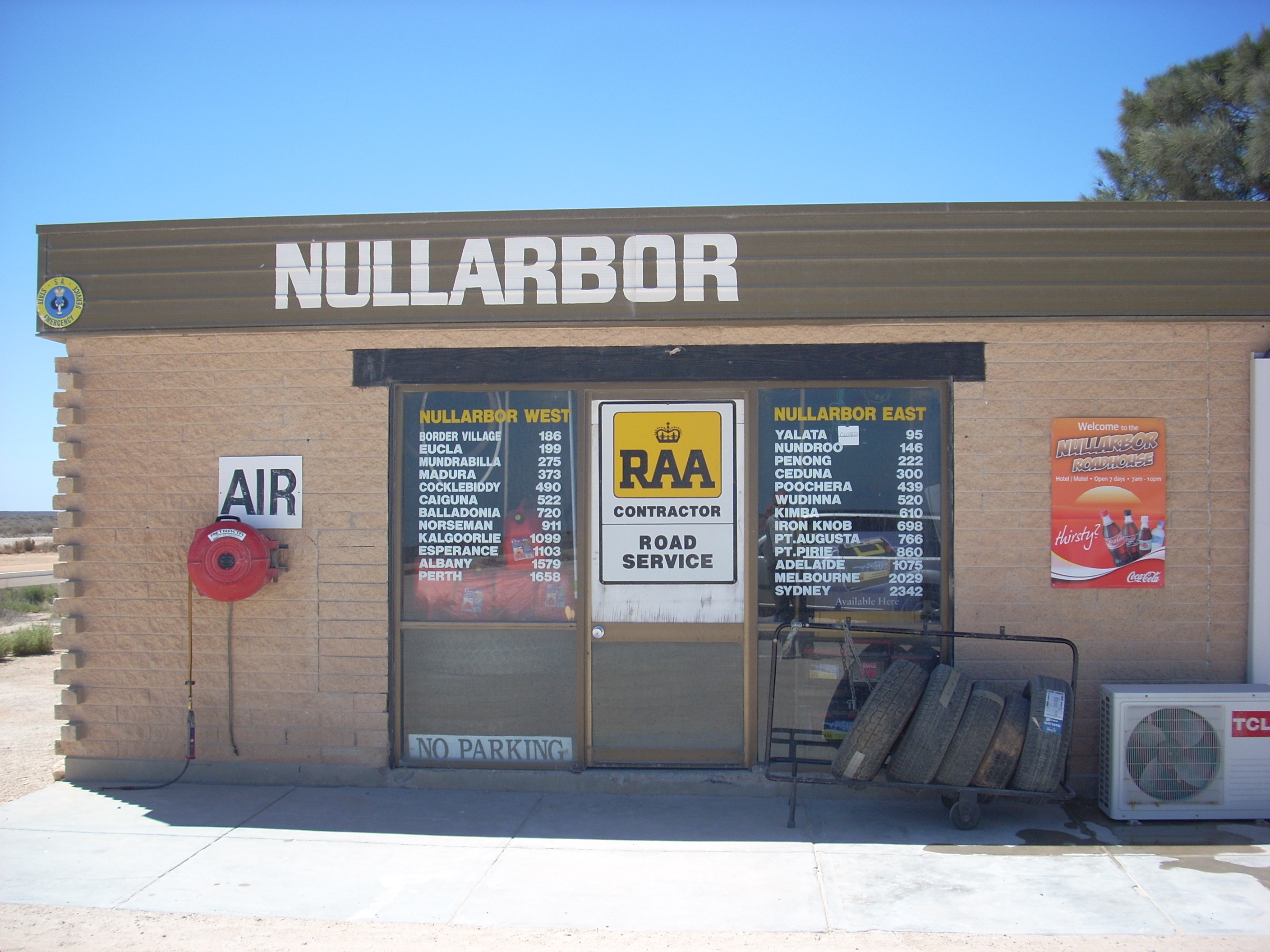
- The Nullarbor Roadhouse

- Coordinates: 31°03′27″S 130°28′39″E
- Country: Australia
- State: South Australia
- Region: Eyre Western
- LGA: Pastoral Unincorporated Area
- Location: 764 km (475 mi) W of Adelaide; 1,617 km (1,005 mi) E of Perth
- Established: 2013

Government
  - State electorate: Flinders Giles
  - Federal division: Grey
- Elevation (weather station): 64 m (210 ft)

Population
  - Total: 71 (SAL 2021)
- Time zone: UTC+9:30 (ACST)
- Postcode: 5690
- Mean max temp: 23.8 °C (74.8 °F)
- Mean min temp: 10.8 °C (51.4 °F)
- Annual rainfall: 252.6 mm (9.94 in)
Localities around Nullarbor
Western Australia	Maralinga Tjarutja	Maralinga Tjarutja
Western Australia	Nullarbor	Yellabinna
Great Australian Bight	Great Australian Bight	Yalata

Nullarbor is a locality in the Australian state of South Australia located 295 kilometres (183 mi) to the west of the town of Ceduna in the western part of the state immediately adjoining the border with Western Australia.

== Geography ==
The name and extent of the locality was officially established on 26 April 2013 in respect to "the long established local name." Its name is derived from the use of "Nullarbor" in geographic features such as the Nullarbor Plain and protected areas such as the Nullarbor Regional Reserve. Nullarbor is bounded in the west by the Western Australia - South Australian state border, in the south by the coastline adjoining the Great Australian Bight, to the east by the localities of Yalata and Yellabinna and to the north by the Trans-Australian Railway.

Nullarbor contains two heritage-listed sites - the Koonalda Cave and the Koonalda Homestead Complex which are both listed on the South Australian Heritage Register while the former is also listed on the Australian National Heritage List.

== Land use ==
The land use within Nullarbor is concerned with the following protected areas which fully cover its extent - the Nullarbor Regional Reserve to the north of the locality, the Nullarbor National Park which occupies a strip running from the border and the Nullarbor Wilderness Protection Area which adjoins the coastline with the Great Australian Bight. Uses included tourism and research associated with the locality's natural features, mineral exploration in the Regional Reserve, and use by indigenous communities for purposes such as cultural activities.

== Access ==
The Eyre Highway is the major road passing through the locality to Western Australia. Settlements located along the Highway include one known as "Nullarbor" at the eastern boundary of the locality and Border Village at the western boundary of the locality at the Western Australian border. These provide services for tourists and travellers such as accommodation and vehicle fuel.

== Politics ==
Nullarbor is located within the federal Division of Grey, the state electoral districts of Flinders and Giles, and the Pastoral Unincorporated Area of South Australia where municipal services are provided to communities such as Border Village by a South Australian government agency, the Outback Communities Authority.

== Climate ==
Nullarbor is located in an area with a mild semi-arid climate described as Köppen climate classification BSk. The automatic weather station located in Nullarbor recorded a temperature of 49.9 °C (121.8 °F) on 19 December 2019, which was the highest daily maximum temperature recorded for Australia in 2019.

Climate data for Nullarbor, South Australia (1888–present)
Month	Jan	Feb	Mar	Apr	May	Jun	Jul	Aug	Sep	Oct	Nov	Dec	Year
Record high °C (°F)	48.5 (119.3)	47.6 (117.7)	45.3 (113.5)	42.2 (108.0)	36.5 (97.7)	30.0 (86.0)	31.2 (88.2)	36.0 (96.8)	40.0 (104.0)	45.0 (113.0)	46.6 (115.9)	49.9 (121.8)	49.9 (121.8)
Mean daily maximum °C (°F)	28.0 (82.4)	27.9 (82.2)	26.6 (79.9)	24.9 (76.8)	21.5 (70.7)	18.8 (65.8)	18.4 (65.1)	19.9 (67.8)	22.7 (72.9)	24.7 (76.5)	26.0 (78.8)	27.1 (80.8)	23.9 (75.0)
Mean daily minimum °C (°F)	16.1 (61.0)	16.1 (61.0)	14.4 (57.9)	11.8 (53.2)	8.8 (47.8)	6.3 (43.3)	5.2 (41.4)	6.1 (43.0)	8.1 (46.6)	10.5 (50.9)	12.6 (54.7)	14.5 (58.1)	10.9 (51.6)
Record low °C (°F)	7.0 (44.6)	7.0 (44.6)	5.0 (41.0)	2.0 (35.6)	0.5 (32.9)	−2.9 (26.8)	−3.2 (26.2)	−1.0 (30.2)	−0.7 (30.7)	1.0 (33.8)	2.5 (36.5)	2.3 (36.1)	−3.2 (26.2)
Average rainfall mm (inches)	12.8 (0.50)	14.0 (0.55)	21.1 (0.83)	22.4 (0.88)	29.2 (1.15)	30.0 (1.18)	26.5 (1.04)	24.2 (0.95)	17.6 (0.69)	18.0 (0.71)	18.9 (0.74)	15.6 (0.61)	250.3 (9.83)
Average rainy days	1.1	1.0	1.6	2.1	3.2	3.3	3.3	2.9	2.1	1.8	1.9	1.5	25.8
Source: Bureau of Meteorology

== See also ==
- List of cities and towns in South Australia
- Bunda Cliffs
- Murrawijinie Cave
- Nullarbor Links
- Wilson Bluff, Western and South Australian border
- Cook, South Australia
- Bunburra Rockhole (meteorite)
- List of extreme temperatures in Australia
