= Nullarbor Plain =

Geographical feature in Western Australia and South Australia

Nullarbor Plain Nullarbor Plains xeric shrublands
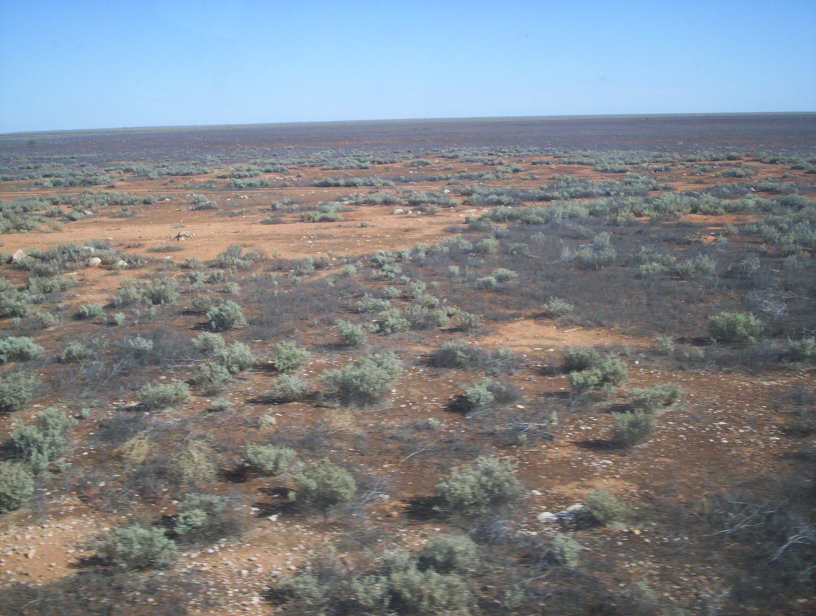
- Nullarbor Plain, Australia

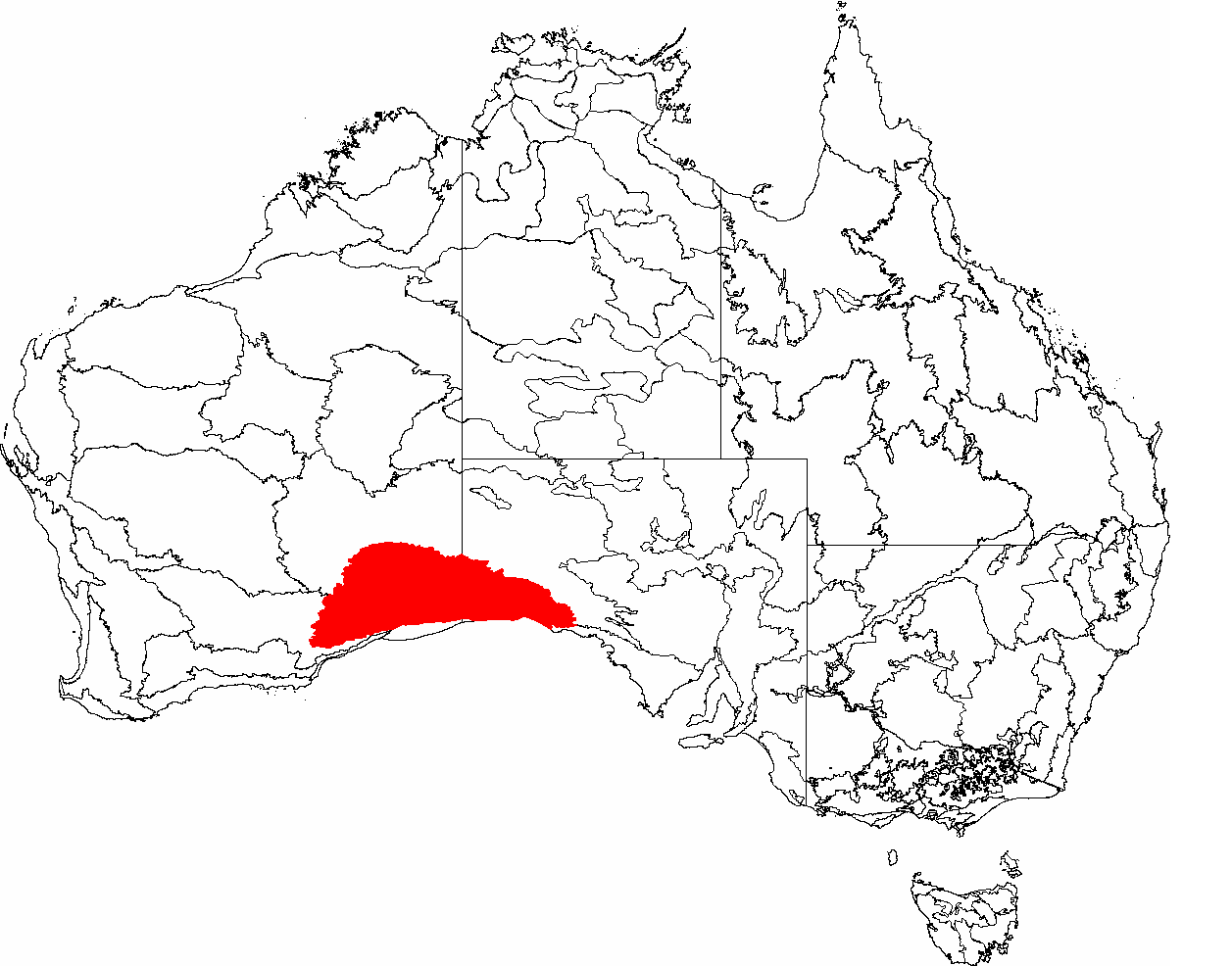
- The IBRA regions, with Nullarbor in red

Ecology
- Realm: Australasian
- Biome: deserts and xeric shrublands
- Borders: Coolgardie woodlands; Eyre and Yorke mallee; Great Victoria Desert

Geography
- Area: 197,195 km^{2} (76,137 mi^{2})
- Country: Australia
- States: South Australia; Western Australia
- Coordinates: 30.3°S 129°E

Conservation
- Conservation status: Relatively stable/intact
- Protected: 62,317 km^{2} (32%)

The Nullarbor Plain (/ˈnʌlərbɔːr/ NUL-ər-bor; Latin: nulla feminine of nullus 'no' and arbor 'tree') is part of the area of flat, almost treeless, arid or semi-arid country of southern Australia, located on the Great Australian Bight coast with the Great Victoria Desert to its north. It is the world's largest single exposure of limestone bedrock, and occupies an area of about 200,000 square kilometres (77,000 sq mi). At its widest point, it stretches about 1,100 kilometres (684 mi) from east to west across the border between South Australia and Western Australia.

== History ==
Historically, the Nullarbor was seasonally occupied by Indigenous Australian people, the Mirning clans and Yinyila people. Traditionally, the area was called Oondiri, which is said to mean 'the waterless'.

The first Europeans known to have sighted and mapped the Nullarbor coast were Captain François Thijssen and Councillor of the Indies, Pieter Nuyts, on the Dutch East Indiaman 't Gulden Zeepaert (the Golden Seahorse). In 1626–1627, they charted a stretch of the southern Australian coast east of Cape Leeuwin and extending to longitude 133 30'E. While the interior remained little known to Europeans over the next two centuries, the stretch of coast adjoining the Great Australian Bight was named for Nuyts, and maps subsequent to 1627 bore the legend "Landt van P. Nuyts" or "Terre de Nuyts". That survives as two geographical names in West Australia: Nuytsland Nature Reserve and Nuyts Land District, and in South Australia as Nuyts Reef, Cape Nuyts and the Nuyts Archipelago.

Edward John Eyre became the first European to successfully cross the Nullarbor (from East to West) in 1841. In writing about Eyre's voyages in 1865, Henry Kingsley wrote that the area across the Nullarbor and Great Australian Bight was a "hideous anomaly, a blot on the face of Nature, the sort of place one gets into in bad dreams". Eyre departed westwards from Fowlers Bay on 17 November 1840 with John Baxter and a party of three Aboriginal men. When three of his horses died of dehydration, he returned to Fowler's Bay. He departed with a second expedition on 25 February 1841. By 29 April, the party had reached Caiguna. Lack of supplies and water led to a mutiny. Two of the Aboriginal men killed Baxter and took the party's supplies. Eyre and the third Aboriginal man, Wylie, continued on their journey, surviving through bushcraft and some fortuitous circumstances such as receiving some supplies from a French whaling vessel anchored at Rossiter Bay, some 36 kilometres (22 mi) east of Esperance. They completed their journey in Albany in June 1841.

In August 1865, while travelling across the Nullarbor Plain, Edmund Delisser in his journal named both Nullarbor and Eucla for the first time.

A proposed new state of Auralia (meaning "land of gold") would have comprised the Goldfields, the western portion of the Nullarbor Plain and the port town of Esperance. Its capital would have been Kalgoorlie.

During the British nuclear tests at Maralinga in the 1950s, the Australian Government removed the Wangai people from their homeland. Since then, they have been awarded compensation, and many have returned to the general area. Others never left.

Some agricultural interests are on the fringe of the plain including the 2.5-million-acre (1-million-hectare) Rawlinna Station, the largest sheep station in the world, on the Western Australian side of the plain. The property has a short history compared to other properties of its type around Australia, having been established in 1962 by Hugh G. MacLachlan, of the South Australian pastoral family. An older property is Madura Station, situated closer to the coast; it has a size of 1.7 million acres (690,000 ha) and is also stocked with sheep. Madura was established prior to 1927; the extent of the property at that time was reported as two million acres (810,000 hectares).

In 2013, a huge area of the Nullarbor Plain, stretching almost 200 km (120 mi) from the Western Australian border to the Great Australian Bight, was proclaimed as the Nullarbor Wilderness Protection Area under the Wilderness Protection Act 1992 (SA), doubling the area of land in South Australia under environmental protection to 1.8 million hectares (4.4 million acres). The area contains 390 species of plants and a large number of habitats for rare species of animals and birds.

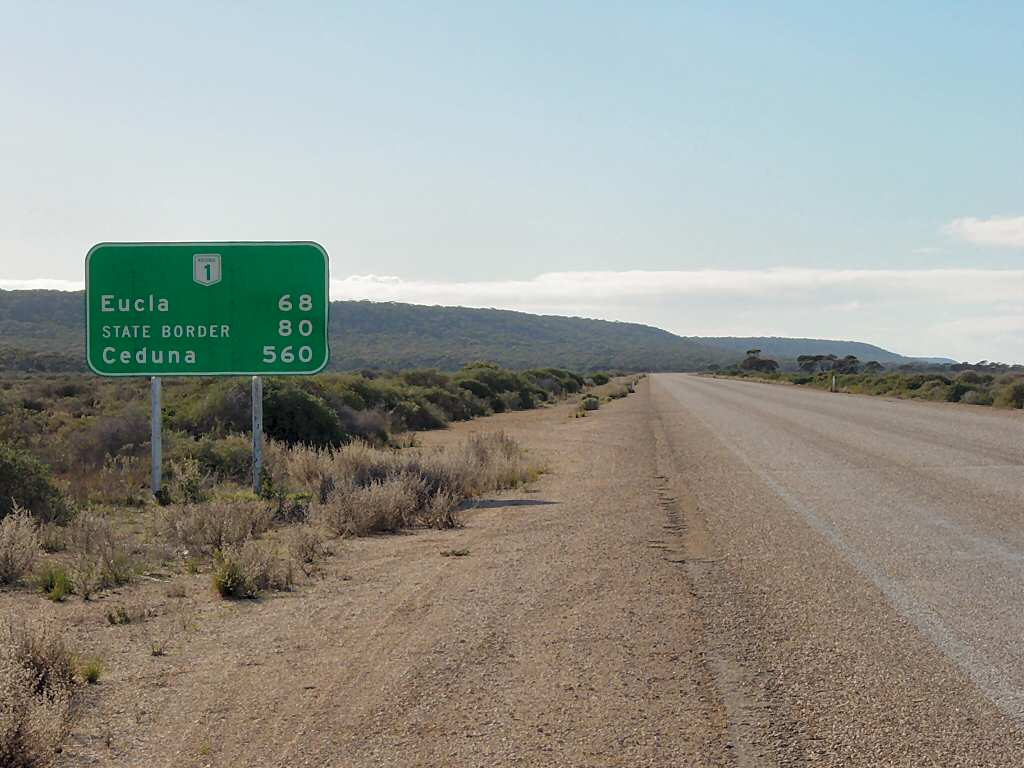
A road sign displaying the distance from Eucla and Ceduna. (Regarding the information on the road sign, this stretch of the Eyre Highway lies not in the Nullarbor Plain, but south of the plain, in the Hampton bioregion of Western Australia, on the Roe Plains, somewhere around Mundrabilla. The Nullarbor Plain stretches behind the hills or, rather, the Hampton Tableland, seen in the background.)

== Geology and geography ==
The Nullarbor Plain is a former shallow seabed, as indicated by the presence of bryozoans, foraminifera, echinoids and red algae calcareous skeletons that make up the limestone. The region is also the location of "Nullarbor limestone" and it has a reputation as a significant karst region with Oligocene and Miocene cave formations.

The sequence within the limestone includes five formations:

- the upper formation is the Nullarbor Limestone which is early middle Miocene in age;
- the Mullamullang member of this formation is a paraconforming member, being separated by 5 million years;
- the third member is the Abrakurrie Limestone that was formed in a central depression of the earlier formation; this is late Oligocene to Early Miocene in age and does not reach the edge of the plain;
- the last two formations are conforming formations; the late Eocene Toolinna Limestone lies on the Wilsons Bluff Limestone which is mid- to late Eocene in age; and
- the Toolinna Limestone does not cover the whole Nullarbor and is extant only in the extreme east beside the Abrakurrie formation which lies in a depression.

One theory is that the whole area was uplifted by crustal movements in the Miocene, and since then, erosion by wind and rain has reduced its thickness. The plain has most likely never had any major defining topographic features, resulting in the extremely flat terrain across the plain today.

According to Curtin University research published in 2023, "Nullarbor drastically shifted to dry conditions between 2.4 and 2.7 million years ago".

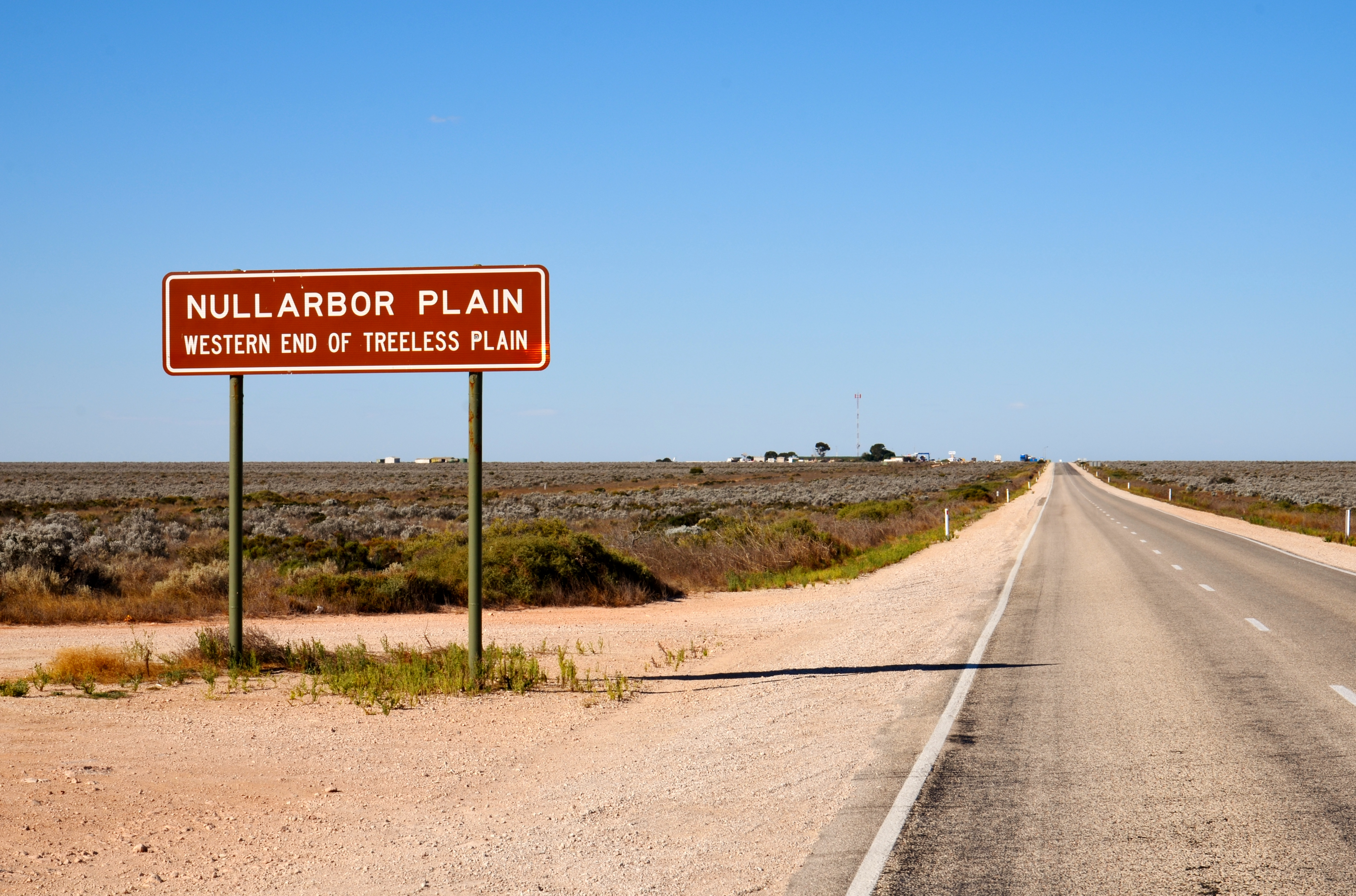
Sign defining the edge of the plain at the western side. (This photograph depicts Nullarbor Roadhouse, seen from the west. Nullarbor Roadhouse lies on the South Australian side of the Eyre Highway, at the eastern edge of the Nullarbor Plain as well as Nullarbor National Park, which both extend miles farther west into Western Australian territory.)

In areas, the southern ocean blows through many caves, resulting in blowholes up to several hundred metres from the coast. The Murrawijinie Cave in South Australia is open to the public, but most of the Nullarbor Caves on the Western Australian side can only be visited and viewed with a permit from the Department of Parks and Wildlife.

The Nullarbor is known for extensive meteorite deposits, which are extremely well preserved in the arid climate. In particular, many meteorites have been discovered around Mundrabilla, some up to several tonnes in weight.

According to the USDA soil taxonomy system, the Nullarbor's soils are classified as mainly consisting of aridisols.

=== Limits ===
Frequently The Nullarbor is expanded in tourist literature and web-based material to loosely refer to all the land between Adelaide, South Australia and Perth, Western Australia. Through observing satellite images, the limits of the limestone formation of the plain can be seen to stretch from approximately 20 km (12 mi) west of the original Balladonia settlement (now abandoned) to its easternmost limit a few kilometres west of the town of Ceduna.

== Climate ==
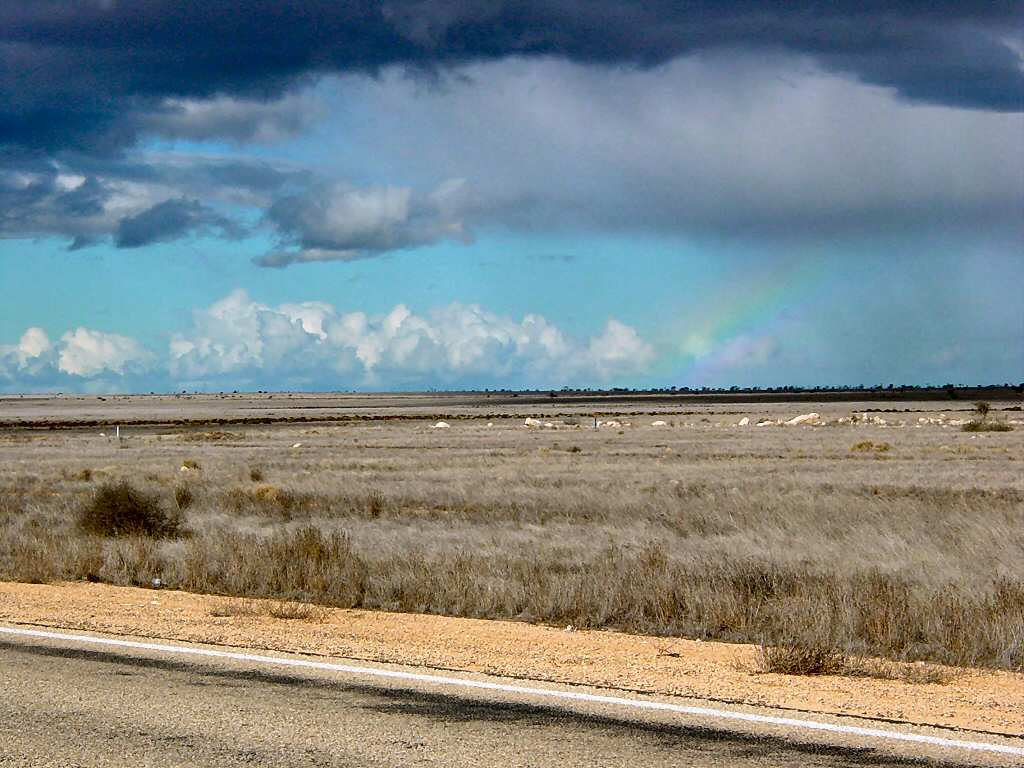
A rainbow over the Nullarbor Plain.

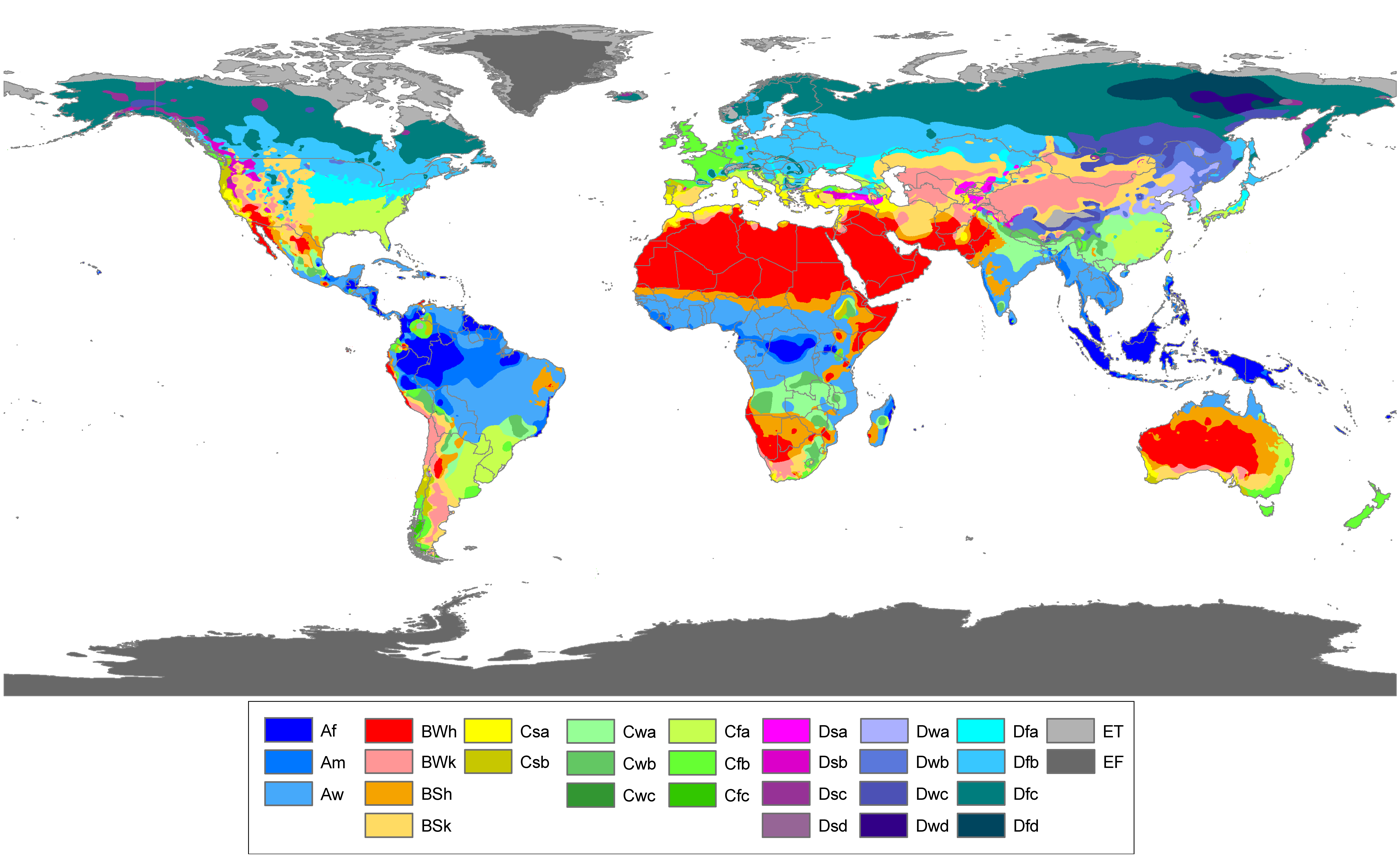
Updated versions of the Köppen climate classifications include the Nullarbor in the cold desert and semi-arid classifications.

The Nullarbor includes desert and semi-arid climate zones. Using updated versions of the Köppen climate classifications, the plain most closely fits the Köppen BWk "cold desert" and BSk "cold semi-arid" taxons (rather than the BWh "hot desert" type found in central Australia). While summer days can be scorching hot, with daytime temperatures close to 50 °C (122 °F), in winter nights frequently drop well below freezing. Close to the coast, temperatures are more moderate and more rain falls in the winter months, compared to the most inland parts of Australia. The mean annual rainfall at Cook is 184.1 millimetres (7.25 in), with most rain falling between May and August. Summers are very dry, with rain falling mainly from sporadic storms; however, occasionally decaying tropical systems can cause heavier rain in the summer months. Temperatures on the plain have ranged from 49.9 °C (121.8 °F) at the like-named Nullarbor, South Australia which is the fourth hottest recorded temperature (and the hottest recorded December temperature) in all of Australia, to −7.2 °C (19.0 °F) at Eyre, which is the coldest recorded temperature in Western Australia.

== Biogeography ==
The Nullarbor Plain constitutes a deserts and xeric shrublands ecoregion, called the Nullarbor Plains xeric shrublands by the World Wildlife Fund. The ecoregion is coterminous with the Nullarbor biogeographic region under the Interim Biogeographic Regionalisation for Australia (IBRA). The ecoregion is bounded on the west and southwest by the Coolgardie woodlands ecoregion, on the north and northeast by the Great Victoria Desert, on the southeast by the Eyre and Yorke mallee, and on the south by the Great Australian Bight.

=== Flora ===
Vegetation in the area is primarily low saltbush (Atriplex spp.) and bluebush (Maireana spp.) scrub.

=== Fauna ===
The fauna of the Nullarbor includes communities of crustaceans, spiders, and beetles adapted to the darkness of the Nullarbor Caves and the underground rivers and lakes that run through them. Mammals of the desert include the southern hairy-nosed wombat, which shelters from the hot sun by burrowing into the sands, as well as typical desert animals such as red kangaroos and dingoes. An elusive subspecies of the Australian masked owl unique to the Nullarbor is known to roost in the many caves on the plain. The grasslands of the Nullarbor are suitable for some sheep grazing and are also damaged by rabbits. The caves provide roosts to large colonies of wattled microbats, species Chalinolobus morio.

=== Protected areas ===
A 2017 assessment found that 62,317 km^{2}, or 32%, of the ecoregion is in protected areas. Protected areas include:

- Great Victoria Desert Nature Reserve
- Nullarbor National Park, a protected area in South Australia
- Nullarbor Regional Reserve, a protected area in South Australia
- Nullarbor Wilderness Protection Area, a protected area in South Australia

== Communications and transport ==
=== Telegraph ===
The need for a communications link across the continent was the spur for the development of an east–west crossing. Once Eyre had proved that a link between South Australia and Western Australia was possible, efforts to connect them via telegraph began. In 1877, after two years of labour, the first messages were sent on the new telegraph line, boosted by eight repeater stations along the way. The line operated for about 50 years before being superseded, and remnants of it remain visible.

=== Railway line ===
The Trans-Australian Railway railway line crosses the Nullarbor Plain from Kalgoorlie to Port Augusta. Construction of the line began in 1917, when two teams set out from Kalgoorlie and Port Augusta, meeting in the centre of the plain at Ooldea, an uninhabited area noted for a water supply. This original line suffered severe problems with track flexing and settling in the desert sands, and journeys across the Plain were slow and arduous. The line was entirely rebuilt in 1969, as part of a project to standardise the previously disparate rail gauges in the various states, and the first crossing of the Nullarbor on the new line reached Perth on 27 February 1970. The Indian Pacific is a weekly passenger train crossing the Nullarbor from Perth to Sydney via Adelaide.

The railway line has the longest straight section of railway in the world (478 km; 297 mi), while the Eyre Highway (refer below) contains the longest straight section of tarred road in Australia (146 km; 91 mi).

Most of the inhabited areas of the Nullarbor Plain can be found in a series of small settlements located along the railway, and in small settlements along the Eyre Highway that provide services to travellers, mostly spaced between one and two hundred kilometres apart. The town of Cook, South Australia, was formerly a moderately thriving settlement of about 40 people, with a school and a golf course. The reduction of railway operations at the town resulted in its virtual desertion, and it now has a permanent population of four. The Tea & Sugar operated until 1996, supplying provisions to the town along the railway line.

=== Road ===
travelling east across Australia's longest stretch of straight road at dusk

The Eyre Highway, which connects Norseman in Western Australia to Port Augusta, was carved across the continent in 1941. At first it was little more than a rough track but was gradually sealed over the next thirty years. The last unsealed section of the Eyre Highway was finally sealed in 1976. Unlike the railway, though, it crosses the plain at its southernmost edge rather than through the centre.

The unsealed Trans Access Road closely follows the Trans-Australian Railway, running all the way from Kalgoorlie to Port Augusta and onward. It services the numerous cattle and sheep stations that populate the Western side of the Nullarbor and affords access to rail maintenance teams. It is a brutally rough road and—despite the amount of traffic it carries—is poorly maintained.

== Cultural significance ==
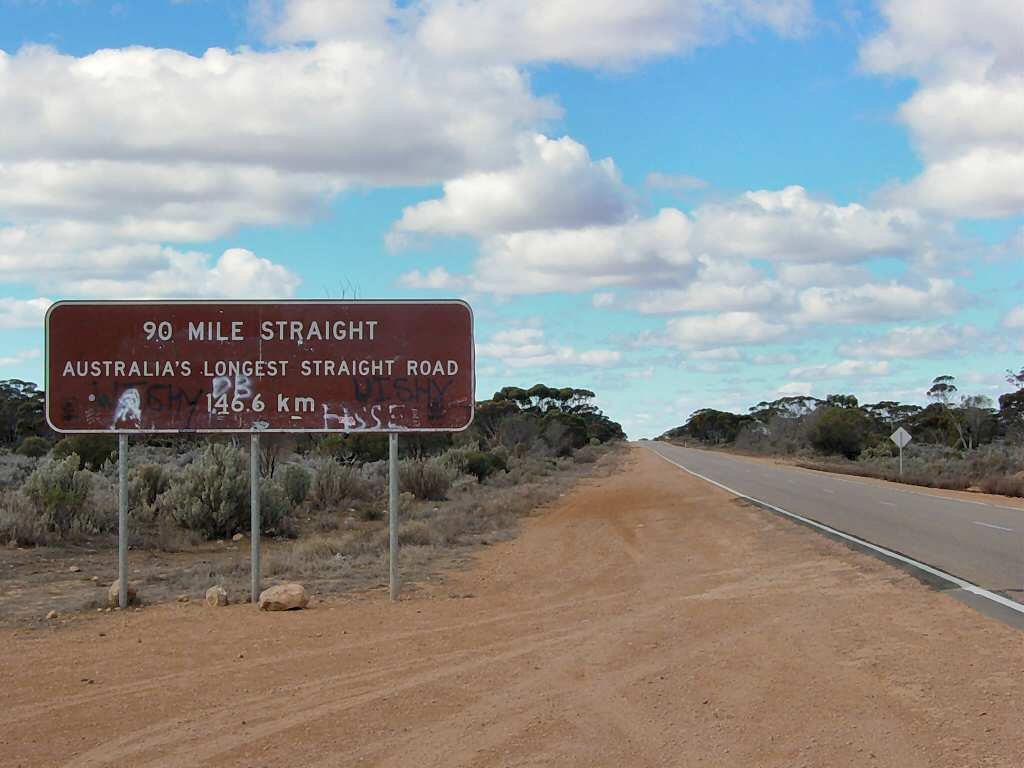
Vandalised road sign designating the beginning of the 90-mile (or 146.6 km) straight section of the highway

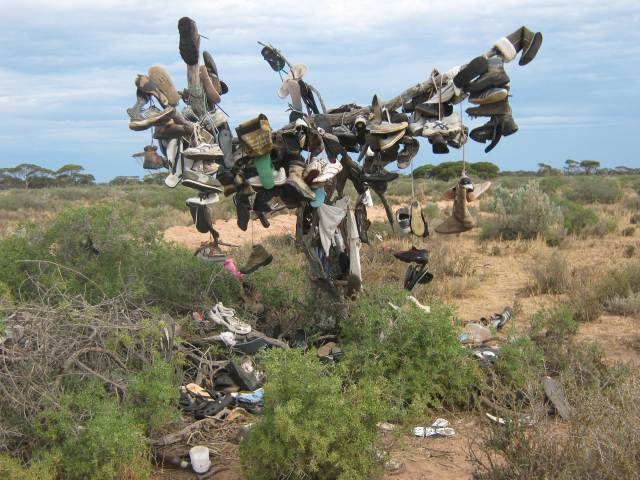
Tree full of shoes, in "the middle of nowhere", the Nullarbor, Western Australia

The Nullarbor represents the boundary between eastern and western Australia, regardless of the travel method. The press might write that a prime minister who visits Perth has "headed across the Nullarbor". "Crossing the Nullarbor", for many Australians, is a quintessential experience of the "Australian Outback". Stickers bought from roadhouses on the highway show "I have crossed the Nullarbor", and can be seen on vehicles of varying quality or capacity for long-distance travel. The desire to "beat the crowds" on overbooked and overpriced air services at the time of special sporting events can also see a significant increase of numbers of vehicles on the road.

Crossing the Nullarbor in the 1950s and earlier was a significant achievement, as most of the route then was a dirt track of variable quality, and presented real hazards to the motorist. It also presented one of the major challenges in Round-Australia car trials (the Redex and Ampol Trials) and gave photographers many opportunities for shots of daring driving and motoring misfortune.

The Nullarbor features in the Australian 1981 thriller film Roadgames. The film was directed by Richard Franklin and starred Stacy Keach and Jamie Lee Curtis. The film has often been cited as one of the best Hitchcock films Alfred Hitchcock never made.

=== Notable crossings and records ===
==== On bicycles ====
On 25 December 1896, after an arduous journey of thirty-one days, Arthur Charles Jeston Richardson became the first cyclist to cross the Nullarbor Plain, pedaling his bicycle from Coolgardie to Adelaide. Carrying only a small kit and a waterbag, he followed the telegraph line as he crossed the Nullarbor. He later described the heat as "1,000 degrees in the shade".

In 1937 Hubert Opperman set a record fastest time of 13 days, 10 hours and 11 minutes for the transcontinental crossing from Fremantle to Sydney. His time cut five days off the previous record.

During their three-year cycling trip around Australia between 1946 and 1949, Wendy Law Suart and Shirley Duncan became the first women to cycle across the Plain.

Between 29 June and 3 July 2015, brothers Tyron and Aaron Bicknell recorded the fastest-known crossing of the Nullarbor Plain on single speed bicycles. Their ride took advantage of the low temperatures in the Australian winter months and was completed over 4 days, 5 hours and 21 minutes, making it one of the fastest bicycle crossings and the fastest done with a single-geared bike.

In January 2017, Austrian cyclist Christoph Strasser set the current record from Norseman to Ceduna of 1 day, 21 hours, 42 minutes.

==== On foot ====
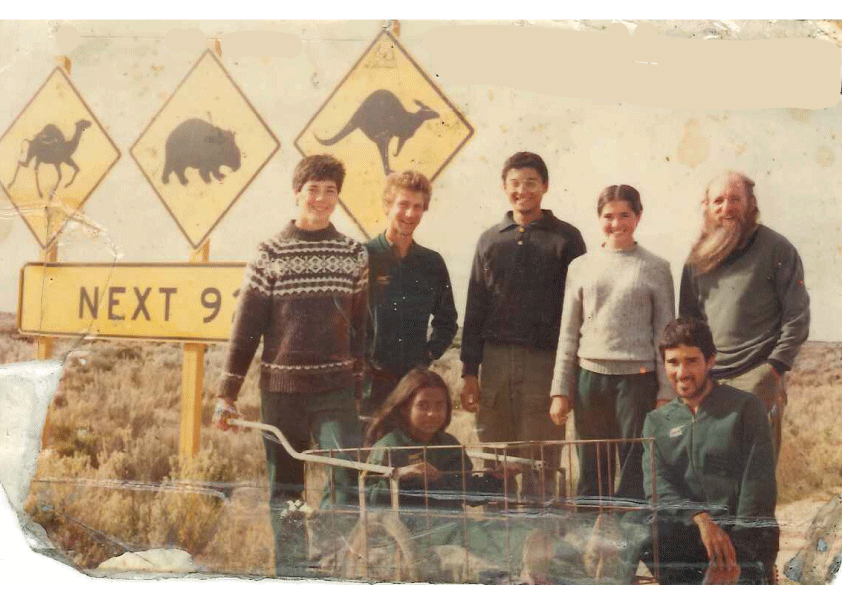
The group that walked from Port Augusta to Norseman, including the Nullarbor Plain, in 1985

The first non-Indigenous person to walk across Australia from the west to the east coast, Henri Gilbert, crossed the Nullarbor Plain on foot, with no support team or stock. His walk across Australia, from Fremantle to Brisbane, was achieved between August 1897 and December 1898.

For two winter months in 1985, six young Jesus Christians walked 1600 kilometres (1000 miles) from Port Augusta to Norseman without taking any food, water, additional clothing or a support vehicle- although supplies were given to them by passing motorists.

In 1998, runner Robert Garside ran across the Nullarbor without a formal support crew, as part of an authenticated run around the world. Unconventionally, Garside obtained water and other support from "passing traffic" who would leave water cached ahead for him at agreed drop-offs, to achieve the feat. In 2010, columnist Dan Koeppel ran the 200 mi (320 km) heart of the Nullarbor with a friend the same way, to further validate Garside'a achievement. Garside commented in his diary, that "the key to running the Nullarbor turned out to be Australian hospitality", and Koeppel concurred that "[F]rom an armchair it is completely impossible to run the Nullarbor. Once you're out there, however, there is a way. Robert Garside discovered it. So would I".

== See also ==
- Bunda Cliffs
- Nullarbor Links golf course
- Nullarbor Nymph, a hoax perpetrated in Australia between 1971 and 1972 that involved supposed sightings of a half-naked woman living amongst kangaroos on the Plain
- Nullarbor, South Australia, a locality within the Nullarbor Plain in South Australia
