= Nullarbor National Park =

National park in South Australia

- IUCN category VI (protected area with sustainable use of natural resources)
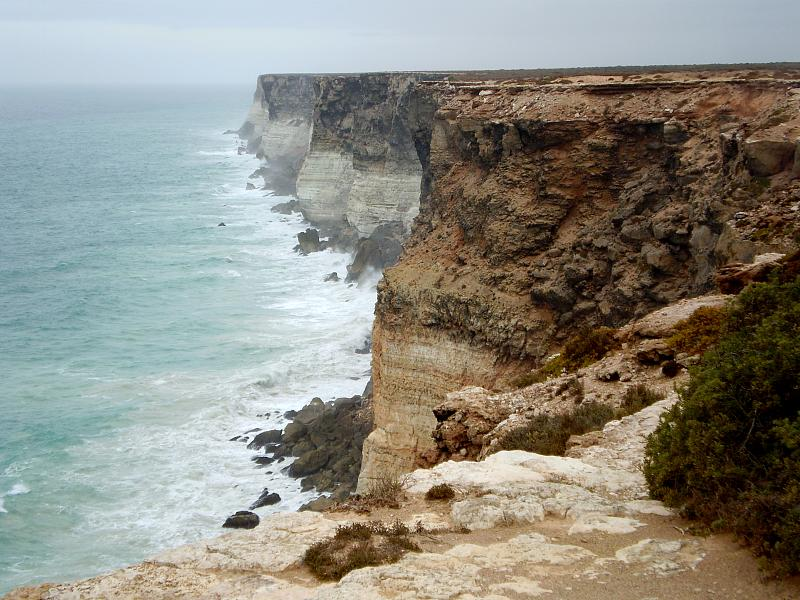
- Nullarbor National Park, February 2008, when its extent included the continental coastline

- Location within South Australia
- Location: South Australia, Nullarbor
- Nearest city: Ceduna (SA); Eucla (WA)
- Coordinates: 31°23′55″S 130°08′16″E
- Area: 323.10 km^{2} (124.75 sq mi)
- Established: 31 May 1979
- Governing body: Department for Environment and Water
- Website: Official website

Nullarbor National Park is a protected area in the Australian state of South Australia located in the locality of Nullarbor about 887 kilometres (551 mi) west of the state capital of Adelaide and about 400 kilometres (250 mi) west of Ceduna.

Founded in 1979, its extent was reduced in 2013 from 5,781.27 square kilometres (2,232.16 square miles) to 323.10 square kilometres (124.75 square miles) by the proclamation of the Nullarbor Wilderness Protection Area. As of 2013, it is bounded to the west by the Western Australia - South Australian state border, the north by the Nullarbor Regional Reserve and to the east and the south by the Nullarbor Wilderness Protection Area.

It is classified as an IUCN Category VI protected area. In 1980, it was listed on the now-defunct Register of the National Estate.

== See also ==
- Nullarbor Plain
- Protected areas of South Australia
