= Wylie (Australian explorer) =

Aboriginal explorer of southwestern Australia in the 1840s

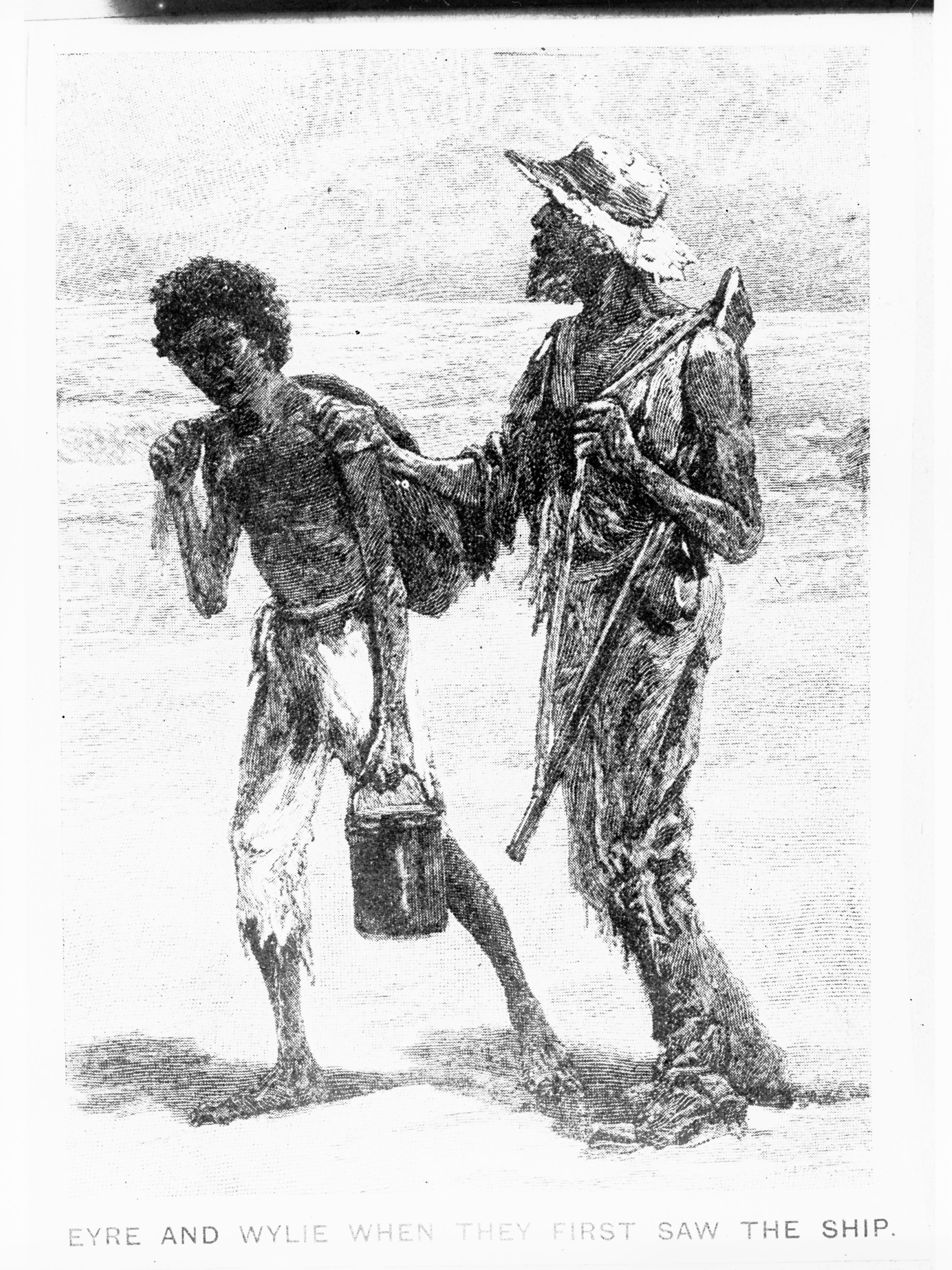
Wylie and Eyre when they first saw the ship.

Wylie (c. 1825 – after 1852) was an Indigenous Australian who was a key partner to Edward John Eyre on his 1840-41 expedition through South Australia. He was a Mineng Noongar man indigenous to Mammang-Koort (King George Sound) in Western Australia.

It is not known why Wylie left his home, but Eyre took him from Albany, Western Australia to Adelaide by sea in May 1840, when he was about 15. He would have left with Eyre on his expedition to penetrate to the interior in June of the same year, but Wylie was ill. Later in the year, Eyre was at Fowlers Bay in the west, having retreated from the north, and Wylie joined him by way of the ship supplying the expedition, the Hero.

Wylie was subsequently one of three Aboriginal boys to accompany Eyre and John Baxter on their final attempt to cross the Nullarbor Plain in 1841. He deserted for a brief time with the other older Aboriginal member of the party, Joey, while the party rested at the sandhills of present-day Eucla, but they returned when they failed to find any food. Several weeks later he proved loyal to Eyre when Joey and Yarry (the other Aboriginal person) murdered Baxter and deserted. Despite the two Aboriginals accosting them and calling for Wylie to join them the following day, Wylie stayed with Eyre for the rest of the journey. Using his tracking skills, he obtained food and water for Eyre in the inhospitable desert, saving him from certain death.

Joey and Yarry had been taken on by Eyre at Gundagai and Yarry may have been the same person as Yarri or Yarree, who saved a large number of Gundagai citizens during the flood of 25 June 1852 and was accused of at least one subsequent murder.

After the completion of the journey, Wylie remained at Albany. He did not receive any of Eyre's fame, but he was given a medal by the Royal Agricultural Society of Western Australia. He spent a brief time as a native policeman, and also benefited from a government pension procured for him by Eyre, who remained in contact with him for some years afterward. In 1844, American whalers decimated the southern right whale population in Mammang-Koort/King George Sound and Wylie raided white homes for food, causing him to be thrown into gaol. However, he retained his pension and in 1848, Eyre had his pension increased. In 1852, he was sketched alongside his wife, which appears to be the last record of him.

There is a statue of Eyre and Wylie in Kimba, South Australia.

== See also ==
- List of Indigenous Australian historical figures
