= Nullarbor Regional Reserve =

Protected area in South Australia

- IUCN category VI (protected area with sustainable use of natural resources)
- Location within South Australia
- Location: South Australia
- Nearest city: Ceduna
- Coordinates: 30°53′27″S 130°33′11″E
- Area: 19,198.51 km^{2} (7,412.59 sq mi)
- Established: 1989
- Governing body: Department for Environment and Water

Nullarbor Regional Reserve is a protected area in South Australia located about 300 kilometres (190 miles) west of Ceduna.

Its boundaries are defined by the Trans-Australian Railway to the north and by the Nullarbor National Park, the Nullarbor Wilderness Protection Area and the Yalata Indigenous Protected Area to the south. Its western boundary is with the Western Australia - South Australian state border while its eastern boundary adjoins the Yellabinna Regional Reserve.

The northeastern corner of the reserve is the locations of Ooldea, and central north Cook on the railway line, and the northern boundary is adjacent to the Maralinga Tjarutja Aboriginal lands.

The northern boundary has the abandoned railway locations of Hughes, Denman, Fisher, O'Malley and Watson, as well as being the section of line that is the known as the longest railway straight.

The Nullarbor Regional Reserve and the adjoining Nullarbor National Park protect the world's largest semi-arid cave landscape, which is associated with many Aboriginal cultural sites. Wildlife inhabiting in the regional reserve includes the southern hairy-nosed wombat

The regional reserve is classified as an IUCN Category VI protected area.

== See also ==
- Protected areas of South Australia
- Regional reserves of South Australia
- Regional Reserve (Australia)
