= Nullarbor Wilderness Protection Area =

Protected area in South Australia

- IUCN category Ib (wilderness area)
- Location within South Australia
- Location: South Australia
- Nearest city: Ceduna
- Coordinates: 31°22′30.2″S 130°09′59.8″E
- Area: 8,942.91 km^{2} (3,452.88 sq mi)
- Established: 6 June 2013
- Governing body: Department for Environment and Water

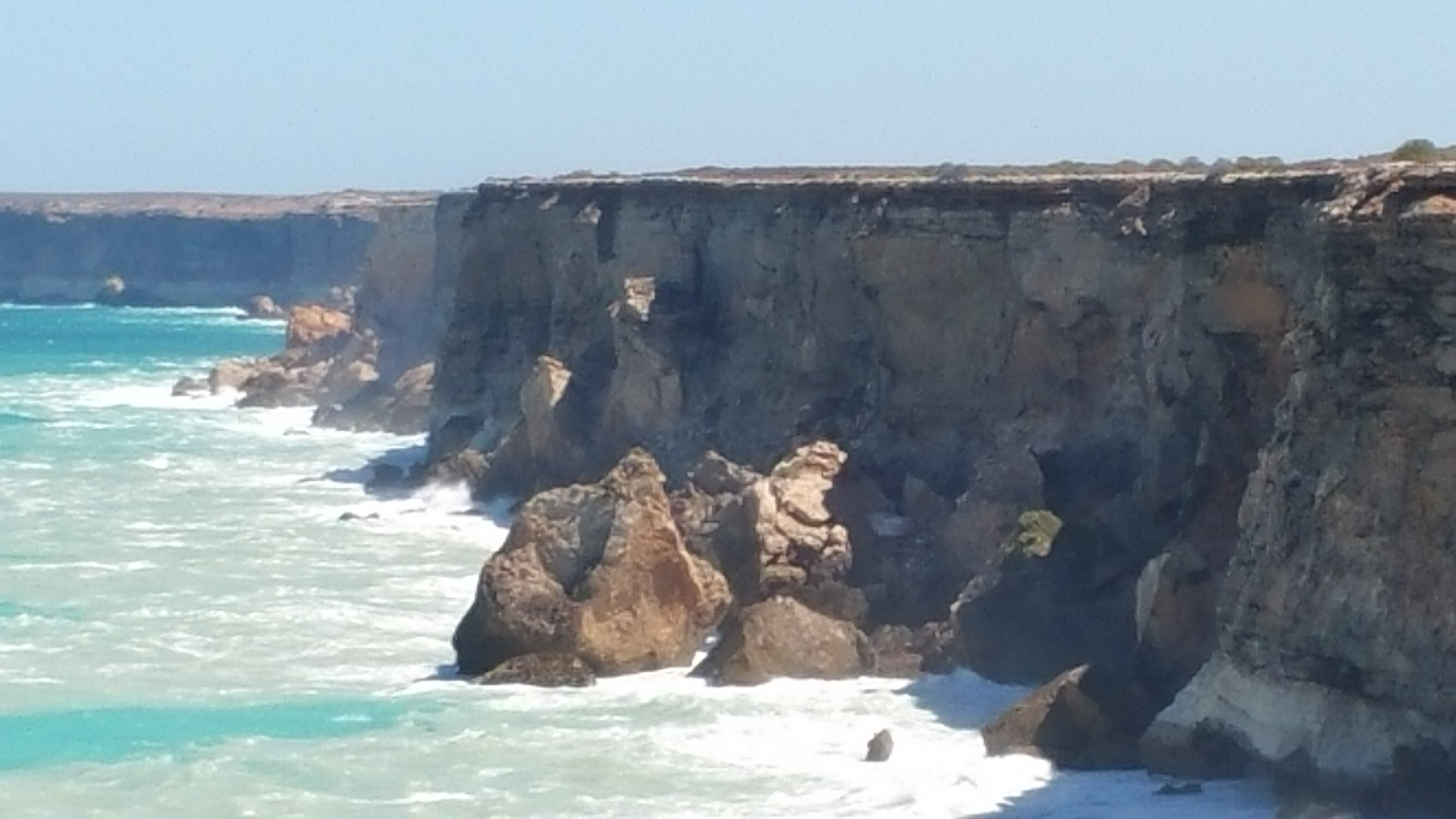
Nullarbor Plain Cliffs

Nullarbor Wilderness Protection Area is a protected area in the Australian state of South Australia located about 270 kilometres (170 miles) west of Ceduna in the locality of Nullarbor.

The wilderness protection area was proclaimed under the Wilderness Protection Act 1992 on 6 June 2013 on land previously proclaimed under the National Parks and Wildlife Act 1972 as the Nullarbor National Park and the Nullarbor Regional Reserve.

It is bounded in the west by the Western Australia - South Australian state border, in the south by the coastline adjoining the Great Australian Bight, to the east by the Yalata Indigenous Protected Area and the Nullarbor Regional Reserve, and to the north by the Nullarbor National Park and the Nullarbor Regional Reserve.

Two heritage-listed sites within the area, Koonalda Cave and the Koonalda Homestead Complex, are listed on the South Australian Heritage Register; the former is also listed on the Australian National Heritage List.

The wilderness protection area is classified as an IUCN Category Ib protected area.

== See also ==
- Murrawijinie Cave
