= UTC+08:00 =

Identifier for a time offset from UTC of +8

- Time zone
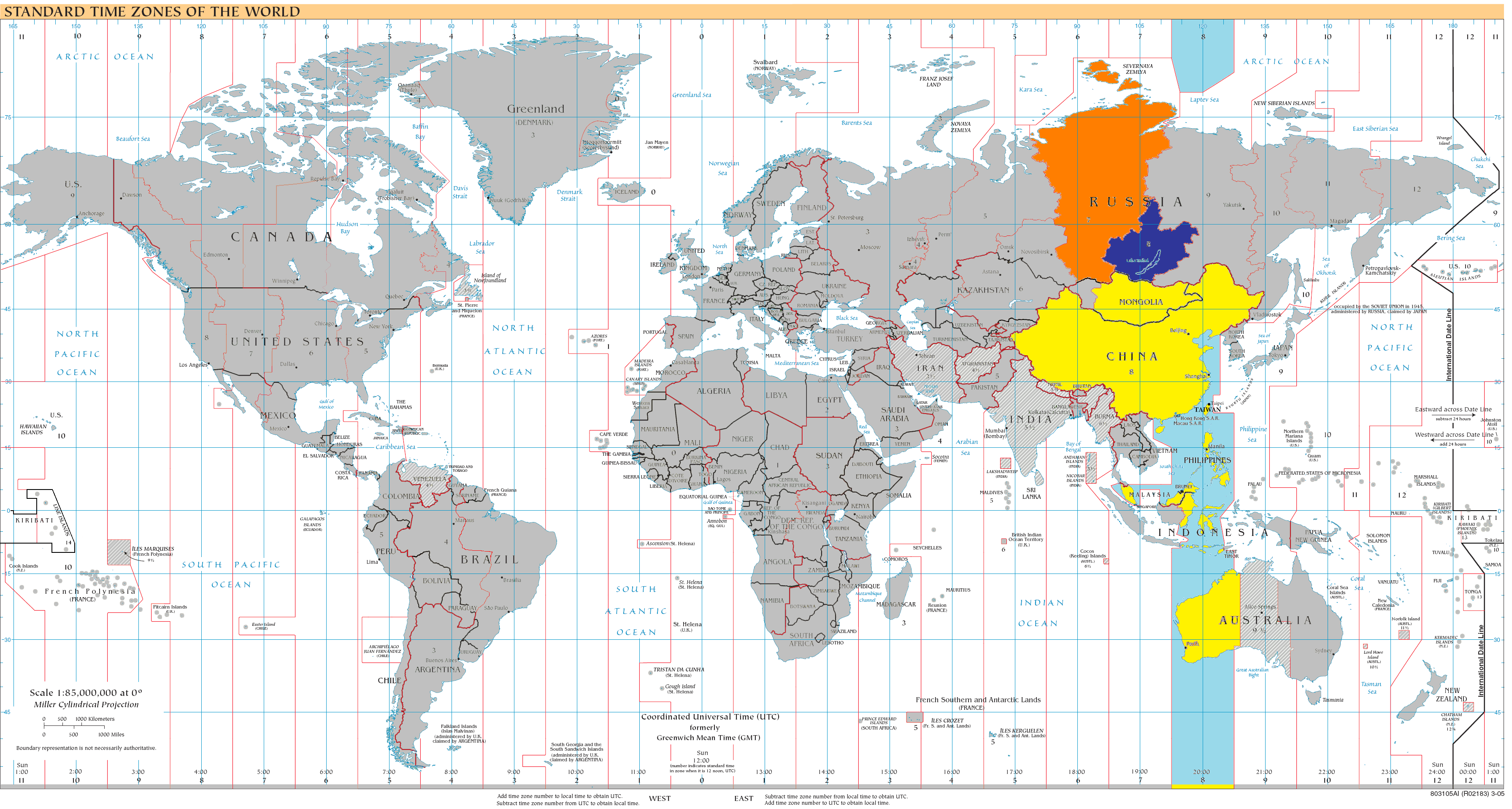
- World map with the time zone highlighted

UTC offset
- UTC: UTC+08:00

Current time
- :: UTC+08:00 [refresh]

Central meridian
- 120 degrees E

Date-time group
- H

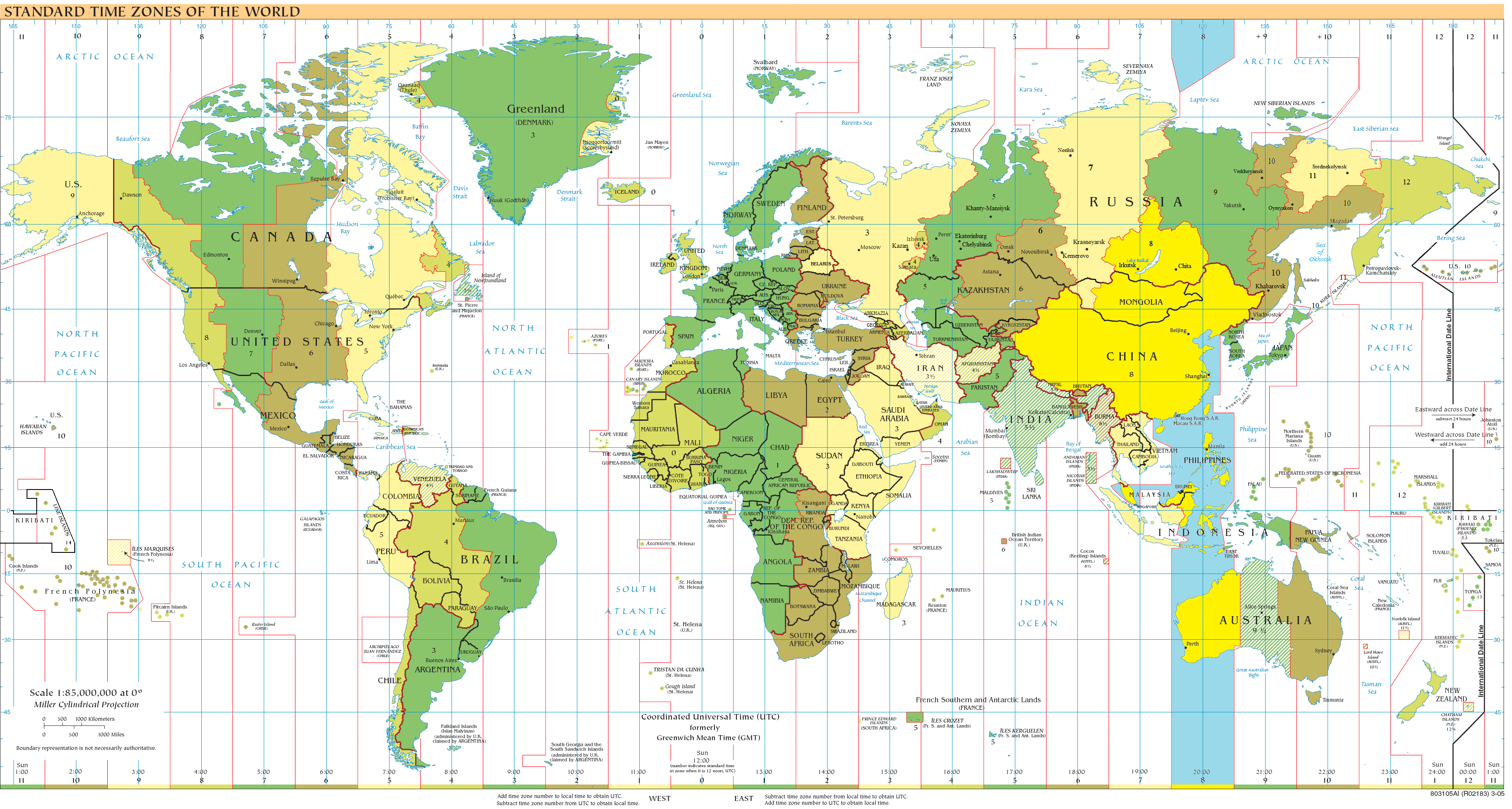
UTC+08:00 in 2024: yellow (observed year-round in all locations), light blue (sea areas)

Time in Russia: KALT / Kaliningrad Time / UTC+2 / (MSK−1); MSK / Moscow Time / UTC+3 / (MSK±0); SAMT / Samara Time / UTC+4 / (MSK+1); YEKT / Yekaterinburg Time / UTC+5 / (MSK+2); OMST / Omsk Time / UTC+6 / (MSK+3); KRAT / Krasnoyarsk Time / UTC+7 / (MSK+4); IRKT / Irkutsk Time / UTC+8 / (MSK+5); YAKT / Yakutsk Time / UTC+9 / (MSK+6); VLAT / Vladivostok Time / UTC+10 / (MSK+7); MAGT / Magadan Time / UTC+11 / (MSK+8); PETT / Kamchatka Time / UTC+12 / (MSK+9)

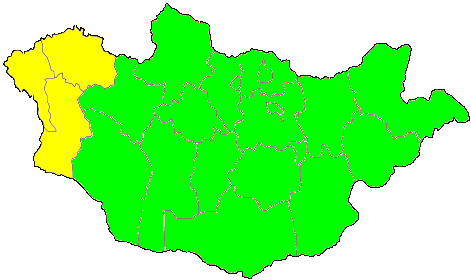
Time in Mongolia Western Mongolia Time (UTC+7) Eastern Mongolia Time (UTC+8)

Time in Indonesia
- Map of time zones of Indonesia
- Western Indonesia Time (WIB) UTC offset: UTC+07:00 (WIB+0)
- Central Indonesia Time (WITA) UTC offset: UTC+08:00 (WIB+1)
- Eastern Indonesia Time (WIT) UTC offset: UTC+09:00 (WIB+2)
- Adopted: 1 January 1988
- Time notation: 24-hour clock
- tz database: Asia/Jakarta · Asia/Pontianak · Asia/Makassar · Asia/Jayapura

Time in Australia: Standard / DST / Zone; UTC+08:00 (year round) / / Western Time; UTC+09:30 (year round) / / Central Time; UTC+09:30 / UTC+10:30 / Central Time; UTC+10:00 (year round) / / Eastern Time; UTC+10:00 / UTC+11:00 / Eastern Time; UTC+10:30 / UTC+11:00 / Lord Howe Island

UTC+08:00 is an identifier for a time offset from UTC of +08:00. In ISO 8601, the associated time would be written as 2026-11-13T04:51:22+08:00. It is eight hours ahead of UTC, meaning that when the time in UTC is midnight (00:00), the time in areas using the time zone would be 08:00.

It is the most populous time zone in the world, as well as a possible candidate for ASEAN Common Time, mainly due to China's large population, with an estimated population of 1.4 billion people.

This time zone is used in all predominantly Chinese-speaking regions, giving international Chinese websites and TV channels the same time.

The time zone is known as Central Indonesian Time (Indonesian: Waktu Indonesia Tengah/WITA) in Indonesia, Australian Western Standard Time in Australia, and Irkutsk Time (Russian: Иркутское время) or MSK+5 (Russian: МСК+5) in Russia.

== As standard time (year-round) ==
Principal cities: Irkutsk, Ulan-Ude, Ulaanbaatar, Shanghai, Beijing, Guangzhou, Hangzhou, Suzhou, Xiamen, Shenzhen, Hong Kong, Macau, Taipei, Taichung, Kaohsiung, Kuala Lumpur, Singapore, Bandar Seri Begawan, Manila, Quezon City, Tanjung Selor, Balikpapan, Samarinda, Manado, Palu, Mamuju, Makassar, Kendari, Denpasar, Mataram, Maumere, Kupang, Perth.

=== North Asia ===
- Russia – Irkutsk Time
  - Far Eastern Federal District
    - Buryatia
  - Siberian Federal District
    - Irkutsk Oblast

=== East Asia ===
- China – Time in China
  - All provinces, ARs, and municipalities – Beijing Time (China Standard Time)
  - Hong Kong SAR – Hong Kong Time (Hong Kong Standard Time)
  - Macau SAR – Macau Time (Macau Standard Time)
- Mongolia – Time in Mongolia
  - Eastern three-fourths of the country, including Dornod, Sükhbaatar, Ulaanbaatar
- Taiwan – National Standard Time

=== Southeast Asia ===
- Brunei – Brunei Darussalam Standard Time
- Indonesia – Central Indonesia Time
  - Parts of Kalimantan:
    - East Kalimantan
    - North Kalimantan
    - South Kalimantan
  - Lesser Sunda Islands
    - Bali
    - East Nusa Tenggara
    - West Nusa Tenggara
  - All provinces in Sulawesi
    - Central Sulawesi
    - Gorontalo
    - North Sulawesi
    - South Sulawesi
    - Southeast Sulawesi
    - West Sulawesi
- Malaysia – Malaysia Standard Time
- Philippines – Philippine Standard Time
- Singapore – Singapore Standard Time

=== Oceania ===
- Australia
  - Western Australia (except Eucla and nearby areas, including Caiguna, Cocklebiddy, Madura (WA) and Mundrabilla, all of which unofficially observe UTC+08:45)

=== Antarctica ===
==== Southern Ocean ====
- Some bases in Antarctica. See also Time in Antarctica.
- Australia
  - Casey Station

== Discrepancies between official UTC+08:00 and geographical UTC+08:00 ==
This section is only partly updated for longitudes using other time zones. This concerns areas within 112°30′ E to 127°30′ E longitude.

- Parts of Russia, including very easternmost parts of Krasnoyarsk Krai, where UTC+07:00 is used, and Zabaykalsky Krai and most of western Sakha Republic where UTC+09:00 is used.
- Parts of Indonesia, including eastern East Java with its capital city Surabaya, most of Central Kalimantan with its capital city Palangka Raya, and eastern part of West Kalimantan, where UTC+07:00 is used, and some of the western islands in the province of Maluku and North Maluku where UTC+09:00 is used.
- East Timor, where UTC+09:00 is used.
- Parts of Okinawa Prefecture, Japan, including Sakishima Islands with its westernmost point Yonaguni, western parts of Kerama Islands, and some islands of the western Okinawa Islands, where UTC+09:00 is used.
- The western parts of Korea, including the North Korean capital city, Pyongyang and South Korean capital city, Seoul, where UTC+09:00 is used.

=== Areas outside UTC+08:00 longitudes using UTC+08:00 time ===
==== Areas between 127°30′ E and 142°30′ E ("physical" UTC+09:00) ====
- Parts of northeast China including the eastern half of Heilongjiang Province and the Yanbian Korean Autonomous Prefecture in Jilin Province.
- Easternmost parts of Western Australia.

==== Areas between 97°30′ E and 112°30′ E ("physical" UTC+07:00) ====
- Singapore
- Malaysia:
  - Western part of Sarawak in Malaysian Borneo.
  - Peninsular Malaysia, where the nation's capital Kuala Lumpur is located.
- Many parts of central China including:
  - Hainan
  - Guangxi
  - Yunnan
  - Guizhou
  - Sichuan
  - Chongqing
  - Shaanxi
  - Ningxia
  - Gansu
  - Western two-third of Hunan
  - Western half of:
    - Hubei
    - Shanxi
    - Inner Mongolia, including its capital Hohhot.
  - western third of:
    - Guangdong
    - Henan
- Most of central Mongolia including the capital Ulaanbaatar.
- In Russia, most of:
  - Irkutsk Oblast
  - Buryatia

==== Areas between 82°30′ E and 97°30′ E ("physical" UTC+06:00) ====
- Parts of China
  - Most of Xinjiang Uyghur Autonomous Region (although many locals set their clocks at UTC+06:00 even if it is officially UTC+08:00, in any case work and shop schedules are two hours after Shanghai and Beijing). See also Time in China.
  - most of Tibet Autonomous Region
- Western Mongolia.

==== Areas between 67°30′ E and 82°30′ E ("physical" UTC+05:00) ====
- Parts of western China including western Xinjiang province (Kashgar) (although most locals observe UTC+06:00 even if it is officially UTC+08:00).

== Historical time offsets ==
The southern half of Vietnam (Republic of Vietnam) was formerly part of this time zone prior to the national reunification on 30 April 1975, making it one hour ahead of North Vietnam. After 1975, the whole country came under the North Vietnamese time zone, UTC+07:00.

According to Presidential Decree 41/1987, Indonesia's ex-province of Timor Timur used this time zone with neighboring East Nusa Tenggara and other provinces in Lesser Sunda Islands, parts of Kalimantan and Sulawesi until independence as East Timor, which the country changed to UTC+09:00 as the official time zone. In addition, West Kalimantan and Central Kalimantan, which previously used this time zone, switched to UTC+07:00 (Western Indonesian Time), following Java and Sumatra.

== See also ==
- Time in China
- Time in Australia
- Time in Cambodia
- Time in Laos
- Time in Russia
- Time in Vietnam
- Xinjiang Time
