= Forrest, Western Australia =

Former station on the Trans-Australian Railway

Forrest
- Town
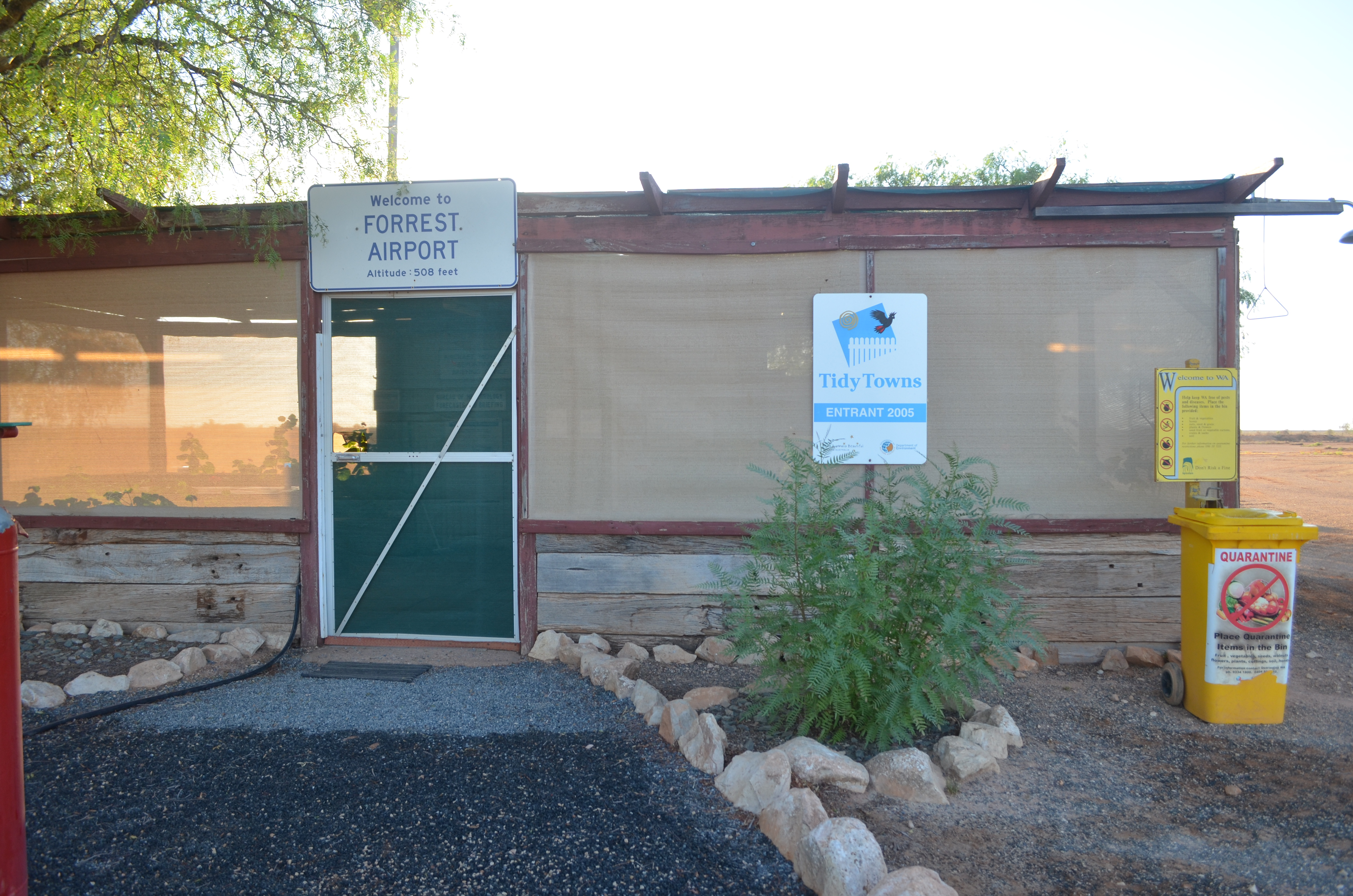
- Forrest Airport Building

- Interactive map of Forrest
- Coordinates: 30°50′53″S 128°06′32″E
- Country: Australia
- State: Western Australia
- LGA: City of Kalgoorlie–Boulder

Government
  - State electorate: Kalgoorlie
  - Federal division: O'Connor

Area
  - Total: 31,639.1 km^{2} (12,215.9 sq mi)

Population
  - Total: 3 (SAL 2021)
- Postcode: 6434
Localities around Forrest
	Plumridge Lakes	Maralinga Tjarutja
Rawlinna	Forrest
Cocklebiddy	Madura, Mundrabilla, Eucla	Nullarbor

Forrest is a former small railway settlement and stopping place on the Nullarbor Plain, 85 kilometres (53 miles) west of the Western Australia / South Australia state border, established in 1916 during construction of the Trans-Australian Railway. It is on the part of the railway that is the longest – at 478.193 kilometres (297.135 miles) – stretch of straight railway line in the world. (Note: The "long straight" extends from about 4.0 kilometres (2.5 miles) east of Nurina in Western Australia to 11.3 kilometres (7.0 miles) east of Watson in South Australia. The end-point coordinates are 30°58′33″S 126°40′07″E and 30°28′10″S 131°37′37″E respectively.) In the 2021 census, the settlement and surrounding area had "no people or a very low population".

The settlement was named after Sir John Forrest, the explorer who became the first Premier of Western Australia. He was much involved in the push for Australia's federation and was the pre-eminent advocate for building the Trans-Australian Railway.

Forrest no longer functions as a minor station as it did when established to service steam locomotives and maintain track. For six decades, a succession of about a dozen railway families lived there to provide essential operational and engineering services. However, from 1951, when steam engines were replaced by diesel locomotives that did not have to stop regularly for water and were very reliable, fewer employees were needed. Later, successive engineering changes – from timber to concrete sleepers, introduction of continuous welded rail, and mechanisation of track maintenance – continued to reduce the need for labour. Eventually all railway facilities were demolished, except for a rest house to accommodate transiting railway workers. After 1997, when the assets of Australian National Railways were sold to private operators, all maintenance of track and facilities was undertaken by non-resident contractors. The track configuration as of 2017 was a 2.6-kilometre (1.6-mile) crossing loop, a goods loop of 540 metres (590 yards) and a short camp-train siding for emergency use.

The sole passenger train on the western part of the Trans-Australian Railway, the Indian Pacific experiential tourism train, does not stop there.

Forrest Airport is an important stopping place on the east–west air route for refuelling aircraft with short-range flight capacity. It was established in 1929, when it was the overnight stop on the first scheduled passenger air service between Perth and Adelaide, operated by West Australian Airways from 1929 to 1934. It has been in continuous use since then. Today, the airfield consists of two sealed runways 1350 metres (1480 yards) and 1520 metres (1660 yards) long, a large aircraft parking hangar, and Avgas and Jet A1 aviation fuel refuelling points. As of 2023, nearby cottages could be booked for overnight accommodation.

By road, Forrest is accessible only by unsealed tracks from the Eyre Highway at Eucla and Mundrabilla, about 110 kilometres (70 miles) to the south-east and south respectively.

== Climate ==
Forrest has a typical arid climate but it is cooler in summer than much of the Australian desert because it is 120 kilometres (75 miles) from the Southern Ocean. Despite this, as of 2021 Forrest held the record for the equal 6th-hottest temperature in Australia, 49.8 °C (121.6 °F) being recorded on 13 January 1979.

Climate data for Forrest, Australia (averages: 1993–2025; temperature extremes: 1946–present.note: a standard 30-year data compilation period has not been used)
Month	Jan	Feb	Mar	Apr	May	Jun	Jul	Aug	Sep	Oct	Nov	Dec	Year
Record high °C (°F)	49.8 (121.6)	47.5 (117.5)	46.5 (115.7)	40.9 (105.6)	36.9 (98.4)	31.3 (88.3)	30.1 (86.2)	34.4 (93.9)	39.9 (103.8)	43.3 (109.9)	45.5 (113.9)	49.5 (121.1)	49.8 (121.6)
Mean daily maximum °C (°F)	33.1 (91.6)	32.3 (90.1)	29.3 (84.7)	26.3 (79.3)	22.3 (72.1)	19.2 (66.6)	18.9 (66.0)	21.1 (70.0)	24.7 (76.5)	27.6 (81.7)	29.8 (85.6)	31.7 (89.1)	26.4 (79.4)
Mean daily minimum °C (°F)	16.5 (61.7)	16.4 (61.5)	14.6 (58.3)	12.0 (53.6)	8.6 (47.5)	6.0 (42.8)	5.0 (41.0)	6.0 (42.8)	8.2 (46.8)	10.8 (51.4)	13.1 (55.6)	15.0 (59.0)	11.0 (51.8)
Record low °C (°F)	6.6 (43.9)	6.3 (43.3)	5.7 (42.3)	2.3 (36.1)	−0.5 (31.1)	−4.3 (24.3)	−4.5 (23.9)	−3.3 (26.1)	−2.1 (28.2)	0.9 (33.6)	2.6 (36.7)	4.6 (40.3)	−4.5 (23.9)
Average rainfall mm (inches)	22.6 (0.89)	26.0 (1.02)	23.2 (0.91)	15.2 (0.60)	15.0 (0.59)	14.5 (0.57)	13.8 (0.54)	12.9 (0.51)	13.2 (0.52)	11.5 (0.45)	25.1 (0.99)	23.7 (0.93)	216.7 (8.52)
Average rainy days	4.5	3.6	5.4	4.8	5.5	7.9	6.6	5.4	3.9	4.4	5.1	4.4	61.5
Source: Bureau of Meteorology

== In popular culture ==
In November 2024, filmmaker Yannick Jamey released a 14 minute documentary featuring the residents of Forrest titled "The Big Wait".

== See also ==
- List of extreme temperatures in Australia
