= Nullarbor Links =

Golf course in South Australia and Western Australia

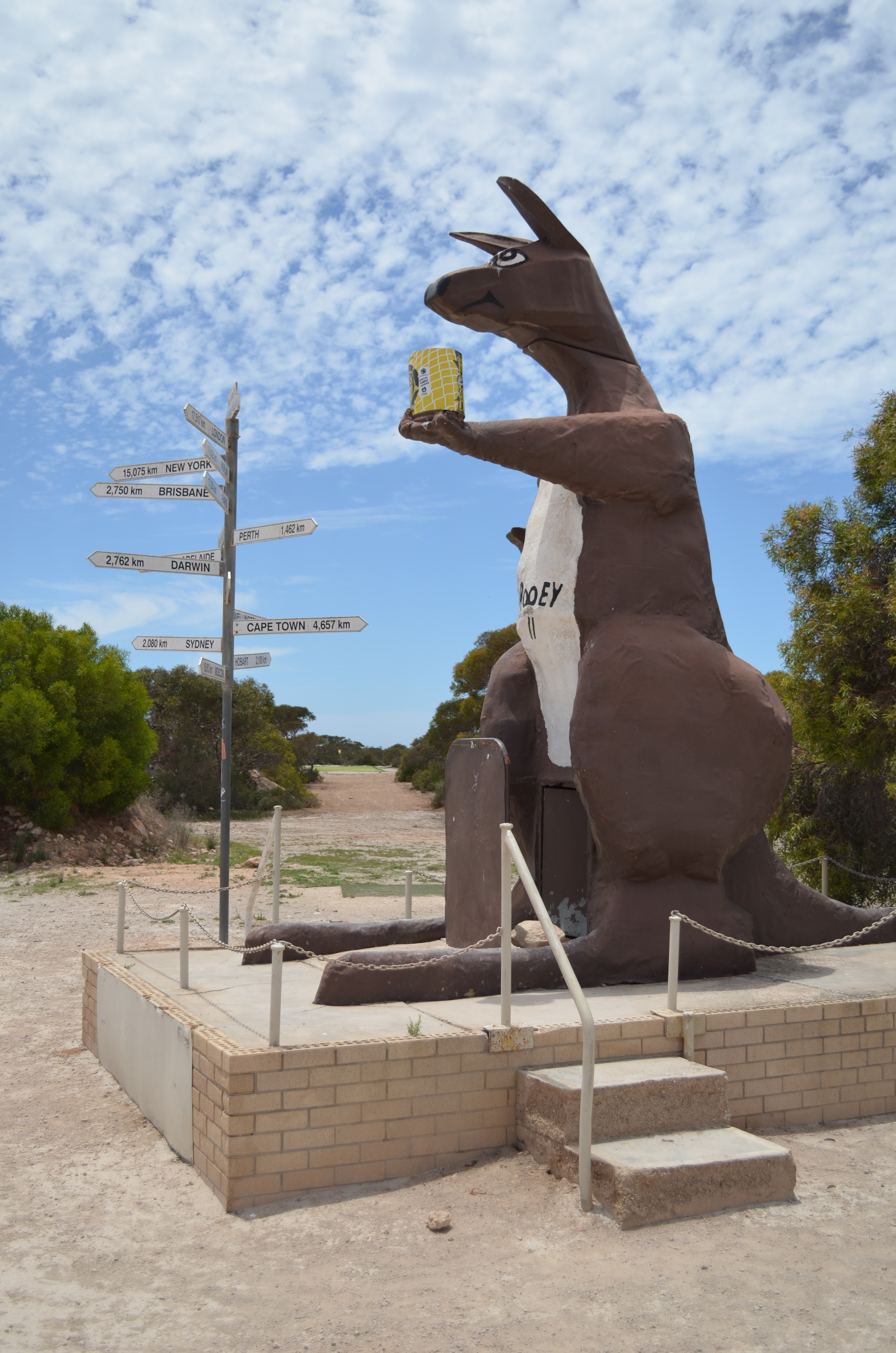
- Hole 6: Border Kangaroo, Border Village, South Australia, 2012.

Club information
- Location: Eyre Highway, Australia
- Established: 2009; 17 years ago
- Type: Public
- Owner: Various owners
- Operator: Eyre Highway Operators Association
- Total holes: 18
- Tournaments: Chasing the Sun
- Website: Nullarbor Links
- Designed by: Robert Stock (consultant)
- Par: 72

Nullarbor Links is an 18-hole par 72 golf course, said to be the world's longest, situated along 1,365 kilometres of the Eyre Highway along the southern coast of Australia in two states (South Australia and Western Australia), notably crossing the Nullarbor Plain at the head of the Great Australian Bight.

== History ==
The idea for the course came from Alf Caputo and Bob Bongiorno, both active in the Eyre Highway Operators Association, over a bottle of red wine at the Balladonia Roadhouse. The course was seen as a way of breaking up the long drive across the Nullarbor, reducing the dangers of driver fatigue, and increasing revenue for the roadhouses.

A feasibility study was completed in September 2006, and public play began in August 2009. The course officially opened on 22 October 2009. As of 2022, more than 20,000 travellers had officially played it, and bought a scorecard for stamping at the roadhouses en route. Course officials have estimated that nearly as many travellers had played the course without paying any fee.

== Course ==
The course begins and ends (depending on the direction of crossing) in the goldmining town of Kalgoorlie, Western Australia and the coastal town of Ceduna, South Australia. Professional golfer Robert Stock, from Manchester, England, consulted on the design that incorporates 7 holes from existing courses and 11 holes created at roadhouses and roadside stops.

The purposely constructed holes have tees and greens that use artificial grass, with natural desert land between. The average distance between holes is 66 kilometres (41 mi), with the largest gap being almost 200 kilometres (120 mi).

Due to its location, the course has many unusual natural hazards, including crows, emus, kangaroos, three species of deadly venomous snakes, wedge-tailed eagles, and wombat holes. A further complication is that the ambient temperatures can reach over 50 °C (122 °F) during the day.

Nullarbor Links course layout
Hole	Name	Length	Par	Tee name/dedication	Location
Hole 1	Oyster Beds	485 metres (530 yd)	5	Graham Hoffrichter	Ceduna Golf Club, Ceduna, South Australia
Hole 2	Denial Bay	370 metres (405 yd)	4	William McKenzie	Ceduna Golf Club, Ceduna, South Australia
Hole 3	Windmills	260 metres (284 yd)	4	Pioneer Drive	Penong Golf Course, Penong, South Australia
Hole 4	Wombat Hole	520 metres (569 yd)	5	Karinkabie	Nundroo Roadhouse, Nundroo, South Australia
Hole 5	Dingo's Den	538 metres (588 yd)	5	Coral & Scobie Beattie	Nullarbor Roadhouse, Nullarbor, South Australia
Hole 6	Border Kangaroo	160 metres (175 yd)	3	Don Harrington	Border Village Roadhouse, Border Village, South Australia
Hole 7	Nullarbor Nymph	315 metres (344 yd)	4	Steve Patupis	Eucla Golf Course, Eucla, Western Australia
Hole 8	Watering Hole	330 metres (361 yd)	4	McGill & Kennedy	Mundrabilla Roadhouse, Mundrabilla, Western Australia
Hole 9	Brumby's Run	125 metres (137 yd)	3	Barbara and Brian Pike	Madura Roadhouse, Madura, Western Australia
Hole 10	Eagles Nest	347 metres (379 yd)	4	Bindy	Cocklebiddy Roadhouse, Cocklebiddy, Western Australia
Hole 11	90 Mile Straight	310 metres (339 yd)	4	Edward John Eyre & John Baxter	Caiguna Roadhouse, Caiguna, Western Australia
Hole 12	Skylab	175 metres (191 yd)	3	Pat Prendiville	Balladonia Roadhouse, Balladonia, Western Australia
Hole 13	Golden Horse	385 metres (421 yd)	4	Laurie Sinclair	Norseman Golf Club, Norseman, Western Australia
Hole 14	Ngadju	463 metres (506 yd)	5	Mort Harslett	Norseman Golf Club, Norseman, Western Australia
Hole 15	Golden Eagle	110 metres (120 yd)	3	George Lister	Widgiemooltha Roadhouse, Widgiemooltha, Western Australia
Hole 16	Silver Lake	392 metres (429 yd)	4	Kevin Higgins	Kambalda Golf Club, Kambalda, Western Australia
Hole 17	Golden Mile	502 metres (549 yd)	5	Bob Bongiorno	Kalgoorlie Golf Course, Kalgoorlie, Western Australia
Hole 18	CY O'Connor	356 metres (389 yd)	4	Alf Caputo	Kalgoorlie Golf Course, Kalgoorlie, Western Australia

== Play ==
The course can be played in either direction. A score card can be purchased in Ceduna or Kalgoorlie for A$70 (as of December 2023), plus an $8 maintenance fee. Players can either provide their own clubs, or hire them at each hole for a fee. To preserve the nature of the Nullarbor, players are required to tee their balls up on the course's fairways and are discouraged from driving vehicles on the fairways. On presenting the completed card they can claim a Nullarbor Links Certificate for playing "the World’s Longest Golf course".

== Tournaments ==
The course is the host of the Chasing the Sun golf tournament, which was inaugurated in 2009. The tournament has been held every September since its inception, other than in 2020 and 2021, when it was suspended due to the COVID-19 pandemic. The 2025 tournament was played during 1–10 May, with the 2026 tournament planned to start on 14 May.

== See also ==
- List of links golf courses
