= Eucalyptus pleurocorys =

Conservation status
- Data Deficient (IUCN 3.1)

Scientific classification
- Kingdom: Plantae
- Clade: Tracheophytes
- Clade: Angiosperms
- Clade: Eudicots
- Clade: Rosids
- Order: Myrtales
- Family: Myrtaceae
- Genus: Eucalyptus
- Species: E. pleurocorys

Binomial name
- Eucalyptus pleurocorys L.A.S.Johnson & K.D.Hill

Species of eucalyptus

Eucalyptus pleurocorys is a species of mallee, sometimes a tree, that is endemic to Western Australia. It has rough, flaky or fibrous bark on the lower part of the trunk, smooth bark above, lance-shaped or curved adult leaves, flower buds in groups of between seven and eleven and conical fruit.

== Description ==
Eucalyptus pleurocorys is a mallee that typically grows to a height of 5 m (16 ft), sometimes a tree to 10 m (33 ft). It has rough, fibrous or flaky bark on the lower 3 m (9.8 ft) of the trunk, smooth greyish bark above. Adult leaves are glossy bright green, lance-shaped or curved, 50–120 mm (2.0–4.7 in) long and 8–20 mm (0.31–0.79 in) wide on a more or less flattened petiole 9–17 mm (0.35–0.67 in) long. The flower buds are arranged in leaf axils in groups of seven, nine or eleven, on a flattened peduncle 9–17 mm (0.35–0.67 in) long, the individual buds on ribbed pedicels 3–6 mm (0.12–0.24 in) long. Mature buds are oval, 8–10 mm (0.31–0.39 in) long and 4–5 mm (0.16–0.20 in) wide with a cup-shaped operculum that is narrower than the floral cup at the join. The fruit is a woody, conical capsule 5–7 mm (0.20–0.28 in) long and 6–8 mm (0.24–0.31 in) wide with the valves protruding slightly above the rim.

== Taxonomy ==
Eucalyptus pleurocorys was first formally described in 2001 by Lawrie Johnson and Ken Hill in the journal Telopea from material collected 120 km (75 mi) south of the Balladonia Roadhouse in 1983.

== Distribution and habitat ==
This mallee grows in a range of habitats from mallee scrub to woodland and heath. It grows in poorly-explored country between Caiguna and the Cape Arid National Park.

== See also ==
- List of Eucalyptus species
