= UTC+10:30 =

Time zone

- Time zone
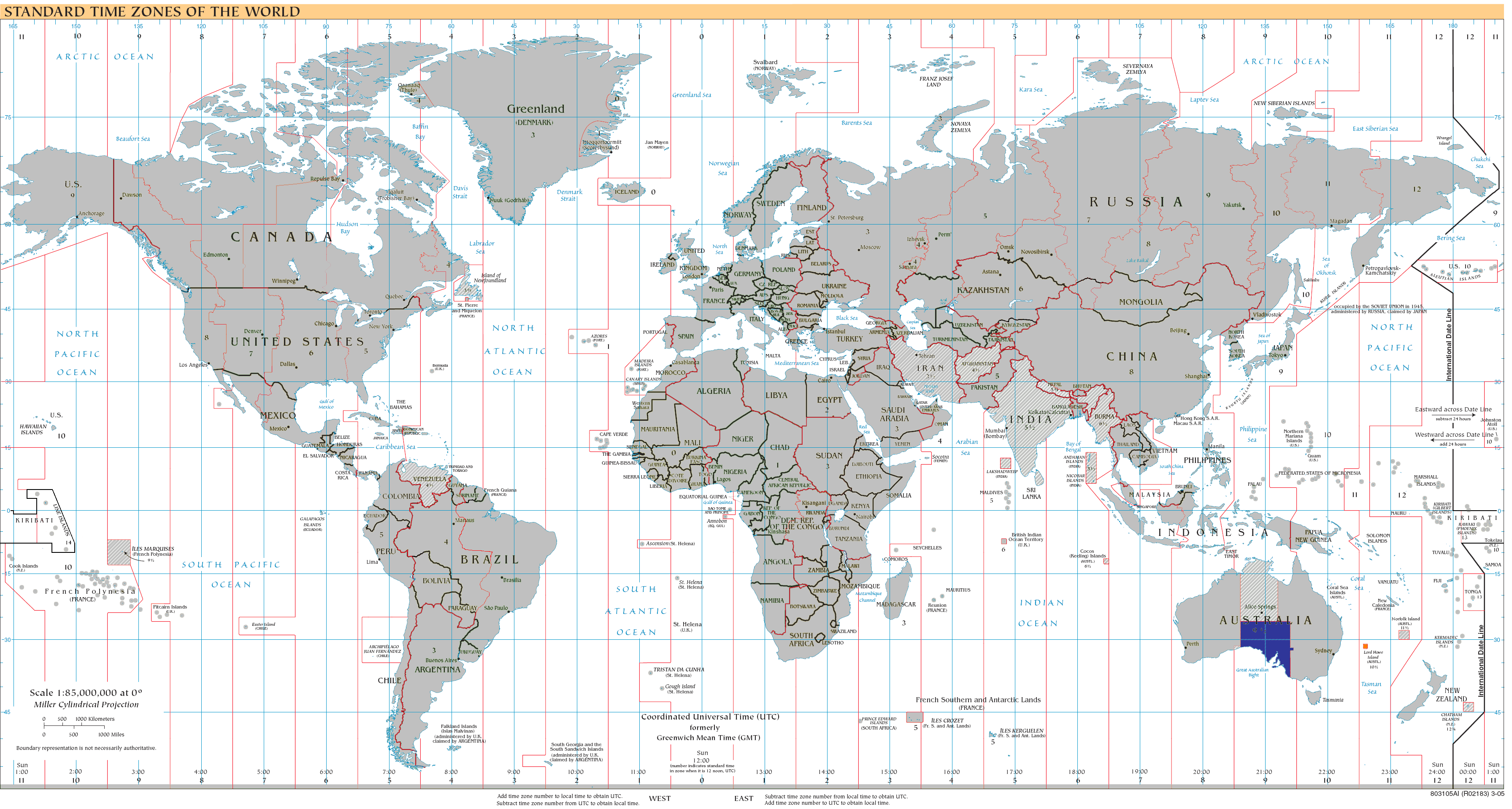
- World map with the time zone highlighted

UTC offset
- UTC: UTC+10:30

Current time
- :: UTC+10:30 [refresh]

Central meridian
- 157.5 degrees E

Date-time group
- K*

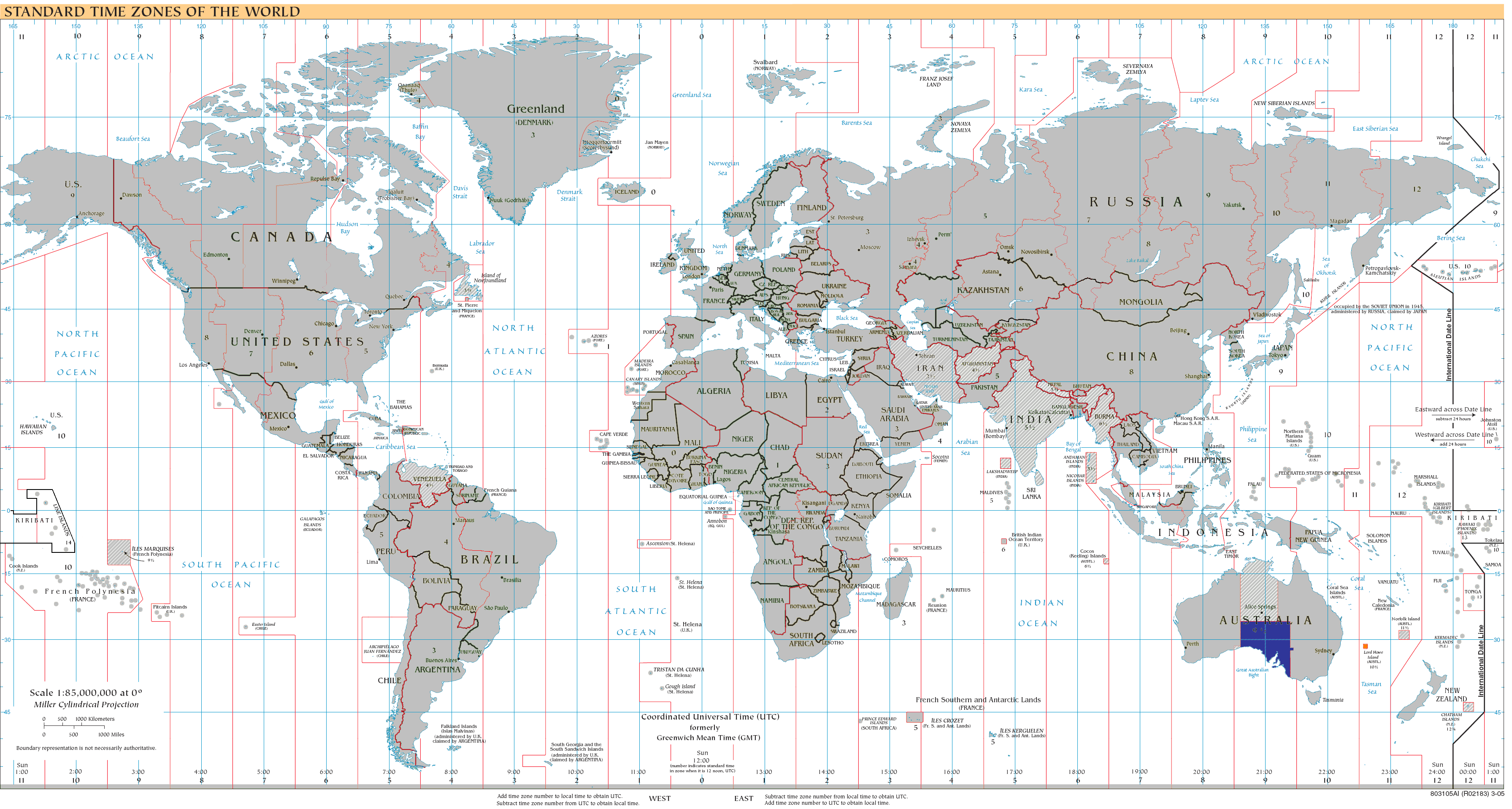
UTC+10:30: blue (January), orange (July), yellow (year-round), light blue (sea areas)

Time in Australia: Standard / DST / Zone; UTC+08:00 (year round) / / Western Time; UTC+09:30 (year round) / / Central Time; UTC+09:30 / UTC+10:30 / Central Time; UTC+10:00 (year round) / / Eastern Time; UTC+10:00 / UTC+11:00 / Eastern Time; UTC+10:30 / UTC+11:00 / Lord Howe Island

UTC+10:30 is an identifier for a time offset from UTC of +10:30. This time is used in parts of Australia.

== As standard time (Southern Hemisphere winter) ==
=== Oceania ===
- Australia
  - New South Wales
    - Lord Howe Island

== As daylight saving time (Southern Hemisphere summer) ==
Principal cities: Adelaide, Broken Hill

=== Oceania ===
- Australia – Central Daylight Time (ACDT)
  - New South Wales
    - All of Yancowinna County, including Broken Hill
  - South Australia (de jure throughout; de facto exceptions of APY Lands and Border Village)
  - Western Australia
    - Giles Weather Station (for meteorological reporting only; ACDT also used operationally until 2024)

== Historical usage ==
=== As daylight saving time (Southern Hemisphere summer) ===
Oceania
- Australia
  - Northern Territory (1917; 1942–1944)

== See also ==
- Time in Australia
