= Acacia carnosula =

Scientific classification
- Kingdom: Plantae
- Clade: Tracheophytes
- Clade: Angiosperms
- Clade: Eudicots
- Clade: Rosids
- Order: Fabales
- Family: Fabaceae
- Subfamily: Caesalpinioideae
- Clade: Mimosoid clade
- Genus: Acacia
- Species: A. carnosula

Binomial name
- Acacia carnosula Maslin
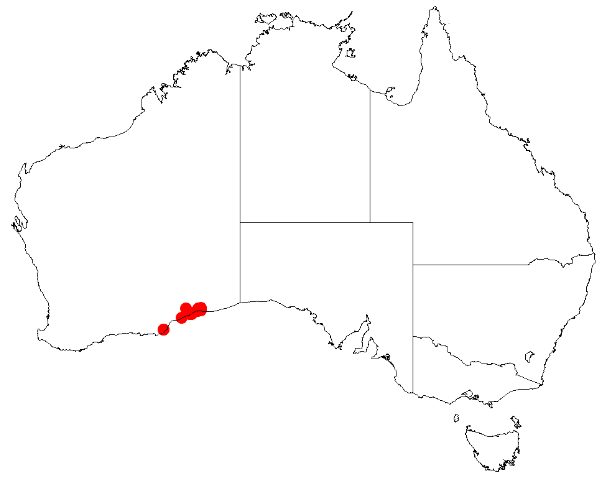
- Occurrence data from AVH

Synonyms
- Acacia aff. profusa [P120] (M.Fitzgerald B68); Acacia carnulosa Pedley orth. var.; Racosperma carnosulum (Maslin) Pedley; Racosperma carnosulum (Maslin) Pedley isonym; Racosperma carnulosum Pedley orth. var.

Species of legume

Acacia carnosula is a species of flowering plant in the family Fabaceae and is endemic to an area near the south coast of Western Australia. It is a spreading, domed or straggly shrub with upright to erect, egg-shaped to lance-shaped phyllodes with the narrower end towards the base, spherical heads of light golden yellow flowers, and linear, papery, dark reddish-brown pods.

== Description ==
Acacia carnosula is a spreading, domed or straggly shrub that typically grows to a height of 0.5–1.5 m (1 ft 8 in – 4 ft 11 in) and has glabrous branchlets with rough bark shedding into irregular flakes. Its phyllodes are upright to erect, thick and fleshy, 5–10 mm (0.20–0.39 in) long and 1–2.5 mm (0.039–0.098 in) wide. The flowers are borne in one or two spherical heads in axils on peduncles 4–6 mm (0.16–0.24 in) long. The heads are 3.0–3.5 mm (0.12–0.14 in) in diameter with 9 to 11 light golden yellow flowers. Flowering occurs from July to October, and the pods are linear, papery, up to 40 mm (1.6 in) long, 2.5–3.5 mm (0.098–0.138 in) wide reddish-brown and glabrous.

== Taxonomy ==
Acacia carnosula was first formally described in 1999 by Bruce Maslin in the journal Nuytsia from specimens collected 19.6 km (12.2 mi) south of Caiguna, Western Australia in 1983. The specific epithet (carnosula) means 'slightly fleshy', referring to the phyllodes.

== Distribution and habitat ==
This species of wattle is native to an area between Caiguna, Eyre and Cocklebiddy with one collection near Israelite Bay, in the Esperance Plains, Hampton, Mallee, and Nullarbor bioregions of Western Australia where it is found on dunes and limestone rises growing in sandy to clay-loamy soils.

== Conservation status ==
Acacia carnosula is listed as "not threatened" by the Government of Western Australia Department of Biodiversity, Conservation and Attractions.

== See also ==
- List of Acacia species
