= Emu Creek Station =

Pastoral lease in Western Australia

Location in Western Australia

Emu Creek or Emu Creek Station is a pastoral lease and cattle station located approximately 150 kilometres (93 mi) east of Coral Bay and 180 kilometres (112 mi) south east of Exmouth in the Ashburton-Gascoyne area of the Pilbara region of Western Australia. The property was established in 1891 as Wogoola Station, named for the permanent waterhole not far from the homestead site. In 1962 the station became Nyang under new management. In 2006 it was renamed Emu Creek.

The property originally occupied an area of 202,343 hectares (500,000 acres). Initially sheep were run at Wogoola and some 20,000 were pastured and shorn in the early years. Emu Creek now occupies an area of 130,000 hectares (321,237 acres) and has a carrying capacity of 1,590 head of cattle.

Emu Creek runs a Bureau of Meteorology weather station, which in 2014 recorded 67 days with temperatures over 40 °C (104 °F). It was also a popular point of interest for tourists and campers for its permanent water hole and the historic Nyang Woolshed, a stop on the Wool Wagon Pathway. As of 2022 new management of the station has closed access to the public.

== Geography ==
=== Climate ===
Due to its very high evapotranspiration, Emu Creek Station experiences a hot desert climate (Köppen: BWh) with very hot, slightly wetter summers and warm, very dry winters. The wettest recorded day was 18 February 1921 with 221.0 mm (8.70 in) of rainfall. On average, the cattle station has 207.7 clear days with 48.7 cloudy days per annum. Extreme temperatures ranged from 49.8 °C (121.6 °F) on 21 February 1998 to 2.0 °C (35.6 °F) on 13 August 1986.

Climate data for Emu Creek Station (23.03°S 115.04°E) (111 m (364 ft) AMSL) (1898-2024)
Month	Jan	Feb	Mar	Apr	May	Jun	Jul	Aug	Sep	Oct	Nov	Dec	Year
Record high °C (°F)	49.2 (120.6)	49.8 (121.6)	48.5 (119.3)	43.0 (109.4)	39.3 (102.7)	32.8 (91.0)	32.6 (90.7)	36.6 (97.9)	41.4 (106.5)	44.4 (111.9)	46.4 (115.5)	48.4 (119.1)	49.8 (121.6)
Mean daily maximum °C (°F)	41.2 (106.2)	40.3 (104.5)	38.6 (101.5)	34.8 (94.6)	29.7 (85.5)	26.0 (78.8)	25.6 (78.1)	27.7 (81.9)	30.8 (87.4)	34.6 (94.3)	36.9 (98.4)	39.9 (103.8)	33.8 (92.9)
Mean daily minimum °C (°F)	24.5 (76.1)	25.2 (77.4)	24.0 (75.2)	20.7 (69.3)	16.1 (61.0)	12.8 (55.0)	11.4 (52.5)	12.4 (54.3)	14.1 (57.4)	17.0 (62.6)	19.3 (66.7)	22.4 (72.3)	18.3 (65.0)
Record low °C (°F)	16.8 (62.2)	16.4 (61.5)	15.1 (59.2)	12.5 (54.5)	7.6 (45.7)	4.7 (40.5)	2.5 (36.5)	2.0 (35.6)	5.7 (42.3)	8.4 (47.1)	12.0 (53.6)	15.3 (59.5)	2.0 (35.6)
Average precipitation mm (inches)	46.0 (1.81)	65.0 (2.56)	40.1 (1.58)	20.1 (0.79)	34.4 (1.35)	36.6 (1.44)	20.8 (0.82)	10.5 (0.41)	2.6 (0.10)	2.1 (0.08)	4.5 (0.18)	14.0 (0.55)	298.2 (11.74)
Average precipitation days (≥ 0.2 mm)	4.9	6.0	4.0	2.0	3.2	4.3	2.5	1.6	0.7	0.5	0.8	1.7	32.2
Average afternoon relative humidity (%)	21	28	26	27	31	35	33	29	23	19	18	19	26
Average dew point °C (°F)	11.8 (53.2)	14.2 (57.6)	12.9 (55.2)	10.6 (51.1)	8.5 (47.3)	6.9 (44.4)	5.5 (41.9)	5.4 (41.7)	4.6 (40.3)	5.0 (41.0)	6.2 (43.2)	8.9 (48.0)	8.4 (47.1)
Source: Bureau of Meteorology (1898-2024)

== See also ==
- List of ranches and stations
- List of extreme temperatures in Australia
