= List of extreme temperatures in Australia =

Map of record temperatures

The highest temperature ever recorded in Australia is 50.7 °C (123.3 °F), which was recorded on 2 January 1960 at Oodnadatta, South Australia, and 13 January 2022 at Onslow, Western Australia. The lowest temperature ever recorded in Australia is −23.0 °C (−9.4 °F), at Charlotte Pass, New South Wales.

== Highest temperatures recorded in Australia ==
Temperature	State or territory	Location	Date recorded
50.7 °C (123.3 °F)	South Australia	Oodnadatta	2 January 1960
50.7 °C (123.3 °F)	Western Australia	Onslow	13 January 2022
50.5 °C (122.9 °F)	Western Australia	Mardie Station	19 February 1998
50.5 °C (122.9 °F)	Western Australia	Mardie Station	13 January 2022
50.5 °C (122.9 °F)	Western Australia	Roebourne	13 January 2022
50.3 °C (122.5 °F)	South Australia	Oodnadatta	3 January 1960
50.1 °C (122.2 °F)	New South Wales	Wilcannia	11 January 1939
50.0 °C (122.0 °F)	South Australia	Andamooka	29 January 2026
50.0 °C (122.0 °F)	South Australia	Port Augusta	30 January 2026
49.9 °C (121.8 °F)	South Australia	Nullarbor	19 December 2019
49.9 °C (121.8 °F)	Western Australia	Carnarvon	18 February 2024
49.8 °C (121.6 °F)	Western Australia	Mundrabilla Station	3 January 1979
49.8 °C (121.6 °F)	Western Australia	Forrest	13 January 1979
49.8 °C (121.6 °F)	Western Australia	Emu Creek Station	21 February 1998
49.8 °C (121.6 °F)	Western Australia	Eucla	19 December 2019
49.8 °C (121.6 °F)	Western Australia	Shark Bay Airport	18 February 2024
49.8 °C (121.6 °F)	South Australia	Marree Airport	29 January 2026
49.7 °C (121.5 °F)	New South Wales	Menindee	10 January 1939
49.7 °C (121.5 °F)	New South Wales	Pooncarie	27 January 2026
49.7 °C (121.5 °F)	South Australia	Tarcoola	30 January 2026
49.6 °C (121.3 °F)	South Australia	Moomba	12 January 2013
49.6 °C (121.3 °F)	South Australia	Renmark Airport	27 January 2026
49.6 °C (121.3 °F)	South Australia	Roxby Downs	29 January 2026
49.6 °C (121.3 °F)	South Australia	Woomera	30 January 2026
49.5 °C (121.1 °F)	Queensland	Birdsville	24 December 1972
49.5 °C (121.1 °F)	South Australia	Port Augusta	24 January 2019
49.5 °C (121.1 °F)	Western Australia	Forrest	19 December 2019
49.5 °C (121.1 °F)	Western Australia	Roebourne	31 December 2023
49.5 °C (121.1 °F)	Western Australia	Geraldton	20 January 2025
49.5 °C (121.1 °F)	South Australia	Ceduna	26 January 2026
49.5 °C (121.1 °F)	South Australia	Marree Airport	30 January 2026
49.4 °C (120.9 °F)	Queensland	Birdsville	25 January 2024
49.4 °C (120.9 °F)	Western Australia	Emu Creek Station	16 February 1998
49.4 °C (120.9 °F)	South Australia	Marree	2 January 1960
49.4 °C (120.9 °F)	South Australia	Whyalla	2 January 1960
49.4 °C (120.9 °F)	South Australia	Roxby Downs	30 January 2026
49.3 °C (120.7 °F)	Western Australia	Moomba	2 January 2014
49.3 °C (120.7 °F)	Western Australia	Marble Bar	27 December 2018
49.3 °C (120.7 °F)	Queensland	Birdsville	24 December 2019
49.3 °C (120.7 °F)	Western Australia	Onslow	14 January 2023
49.3 °C (120.7 °F)	Western Australia	Marble Bar	30 December 2023
49.3 °C (120.7 °F)	Western Australia	Geraldton Airport	18 February 2024
49.3 °C (120.7 °F)	Western Australia	Geraldton Airport	20 January 2025

It was previously thought that the highest temperature in Australia was 53.1 °C (127.6 °F) in Cloncurry, Queensland, on 16 January 1889. This record has been removed by the Bureau of Meteorology though as it was measured using a non-standard temperature screen. It is believed that the temperature that day was most likely about 47 °C (117 °F).

== Highest temperatures for each state and territory ==
Temperature	State or territory	Location	Date recorded
50.7 °C (123.3 °F)	South Australia	Oodnadatta	2 January 1960
50.7 °C (123.3 °F)	Western Australia	Onslow	13 January 2022
50.1 °C (122.2 °F)	New South Wales (Note: Source combines New South Wales and the Australian Capital Territory into one group.)	Wilcannia	11 January 1939
49.5 °C (121.1 °F)	Queensland	Birdsville	24 December 1972
48.9 °C (120.0 °F)	Victoria	Hopetoun	27 January 2026
48.9 °C (120.0 °F)	Victoria	Walpeup	27 January 2026
48.3 °C (118.9 °F)	Northern Territory	Finke	1 January 1960
48.3 °C (118.9 °F)	Northern Territory	Finke	2 January 1960
42.2 °C (108.0 °F)	Tasmania	Scamander	30 January 2009

== Lowest temperatures recorded in Australia ==
Temperature	State or territory	Location	Date recorded
−23.0 °C (−9.4 °F)	New South Wales	Charlotte Pass	29 June 1994
−20.6 °C (−5.1 °F)	New South Wales	Charlotte Pass	14 August 1968
−19.6 °C (−3.3 °F)	New South Wales	Charlotte Pass	20 July 2010
−19.0 °C (−2.2 °F)	New South Wales	Charlotte Pass	30 June 1994
−19.0 °C (−2.2 °F)	New South Wales	Charlotte Pass	1 July 1994
−19.0 °C (−2.2 °F)	New South Wales	Charlotte Pass	16 August 2004
−18.0 °C (−0.4 °F)	New South Wales	Perisher Valley	29 June 1994
−18.0 °C (−0.4 °F)	New South Wales	Charlotte Pass	12 July 1998
−17.8 °C (0.0 °F)	New South Wales	Kiandra	8 July 1960
−17.8 °C (0.0 °F)	New South Wales	Kiandra	10 August 1965
−17.8 °C (0.0 °F)	New South Wales	Kiandra	21 July 1966

== Lowest temperatures for each state and territory ==
Temperature	State or territory	Location	Date recorded
−23.0 °C (−9.4 °F)	New South Wales	Charlotte Pass	29 June 1994
−14.2 °C (6.4 °F)	Tasmania	Liawenee	7 August 2020
−11.7 °C (10.9 °F)	Victoria	Falls Creek	3 July 1970
−11.7 °C (10.9 °F)	Victoria	Omeo	15 June 1965
−10.6 °C (12.9 °F)	Queensland	The Hermitage	12 July 1965
−10.6 °C (12.9 °F)	Queensland	Stanthorpe	23 June 1961
−8.2 °C (17.2 °F)	South Australia	Yongala	20 July 1976
−7.5 °C (18.5 °F)	Northern Territory	Alice Springs	17 July 1976
−7.2 °C (19.0 °F)	Western Australia	Eyre Bird Observatory	17 August 2008

== Extreme temperatures for major Australian states and territories ==
State	Highest maximum	Date	Location	Lowest minimum	Date	Location	Difference
New South Wales	50.1 °C (122.2 °F)	11 January 1939	Wilcannia	−23.0 °C (−9.4 °F)	29 June 1994	Charlotte Pass	73.1 °C (131.6 °F)
Northern Territory	48.3 °C (118.9 °F)	1 January 1960	Finke	−7.5 °C (18.5 °F)	17 July 1976	Alice Springs	55.8 °C (100.4 °F)
Northern Territory	48.3 °C (118.9 °F)	2 January 1960	Finke	−7.5 °C (18.5 °F)	17 July 1976	Alice Springs	55.8 °C (100.4 °F)
Queensland	49.5 °C (121.1 °F)	24 December 1972	Birdsville	−10.6 °C (12.9 °F)	23 June 1961	Stanthorpe	60.1 °C (108.2 °F)
Queensland	49.5 °C (121.1 °F)	24 December 1972	Birdsville	−10.6 °C (12.9 °F)	12 July 1965	The Hermitage	60.1 °C (108.2 °F)
South Australia	50.7 °C (123.3 °F)	2 January 1960	Oodnadatta	−8.2 °C (17.2 °F)	20 July 1976	Yongala	58.9 °C (106.0 °F)
Tasmania	42.2 °C (108.0 °F)	30 January 2009	Scamander	−14.2 °C (6.4 °F)	7 August 2020	Liawenee	56.4 °C (101.5 °F)
Victoria	48.9 °C (120.0 °F)	27 January 2026	Hopetoun	−11.7 °C (10.9 °F)	15 June 1965	Omeo	60.6 °C (109.1 °F)
Victoria	48.9 °C (120.0 °F)	27 January 2026	Walpeup	−11.7 °C (10.9 °F)	3 July 1970	Falls Creek	60.6 °C (109.1 °F)
Western Australia	50.7 °C (123.3 °F)	13 January 2022	Onslow	−7.2 °C (19.0 °F)	17 August 2008	Eyre Bird Observatory	57.9 °C (104.2 °F)

== Miscellaneous records ==
Record	Temperature	State or territory	Location	Date recorded
Highest average monthly maximum temperature	41.5 °C (106.7 °F)	Western Australia	Marble Bar	December
Longest hot spell	160 days above 37.8 °C (100.0 °F)	Western Australia	Marble Bar	31 October 1923 to 7 April 1924
Greatest diurnal temperature range	6.8 °C (44.2 °F) to 44.2 °C (111.6 °F)	Western Australia	Eyre Bird Observatory	5 March 2008
Greatest overall temperature range	−9.4 °C (15.1 °F) to 46.8 °C (116.2 °F)	Queensland	Mitchell	High: 19 January 1980 Low: 15 August 1979
Highest Daily Minimum Temperature	36.6 °C (97.9 °F)	New South Wales	Wanaaring	26 January 2019

== See also ==
- Climate of Australia
