= Balgair =

Pastoral lease in Western Australia

Coordinates: 31.158°S 125.598°E

Location in Western Australia

Balgair or Balgair Station is a pastoral lease, currently operating as a cattle station and previously as a sheep station. It is located about 25 kilometres (16 mi) west of Rawlinna and 374 kilometres (232 mi) east of Kambalda on the Nullarbor Plain in the Goldfields of Western Australia. The surface land system is described as a "deflated limestone plain" that has severe erosion in parts. Balgair is bordered to the south by Arubiddy Station and also shares a border with vacant crown land.

The property was established in the mid-1960s when three blocks east of Rawlinna Station became available. Over 32 applicants wanted to settle the blocks that later became known as Balgair, Kybo and Desert Downs.

When running sheep it has been stocked with up to 10,000 head and has a maximum carrying capacity of 17,500. It has good quality underground water with seven equipped bores and a further four unequipped bores on undeveloped areas. The property has a homestead, a four-stand shearing shed and drafting yards. The station was recently listed for sale at A$2.1 million.

Since at least 2001 Balgair was owned and managed by Mark and Karen Forrester, who also operate Kanandah Station. Both properties produce certified organic beef. The area suffered from drought from 2002 to 2009, with cattle from Balgair being trucked from the property and agisted further west.

== See also ==
- List of ranches and stations
