= UTC+08:45 =

Time zone in Australia

- Time zone

UTC offset
- UTC: UTC+08:45

Current time
- 03:56, 14 January 2026 UTC+08:45 [refresh]

Central meridian
- 131.25 degrees E

Location of Eucla in Australia, UTC+08:45 is observed here and in some other localities on the highway

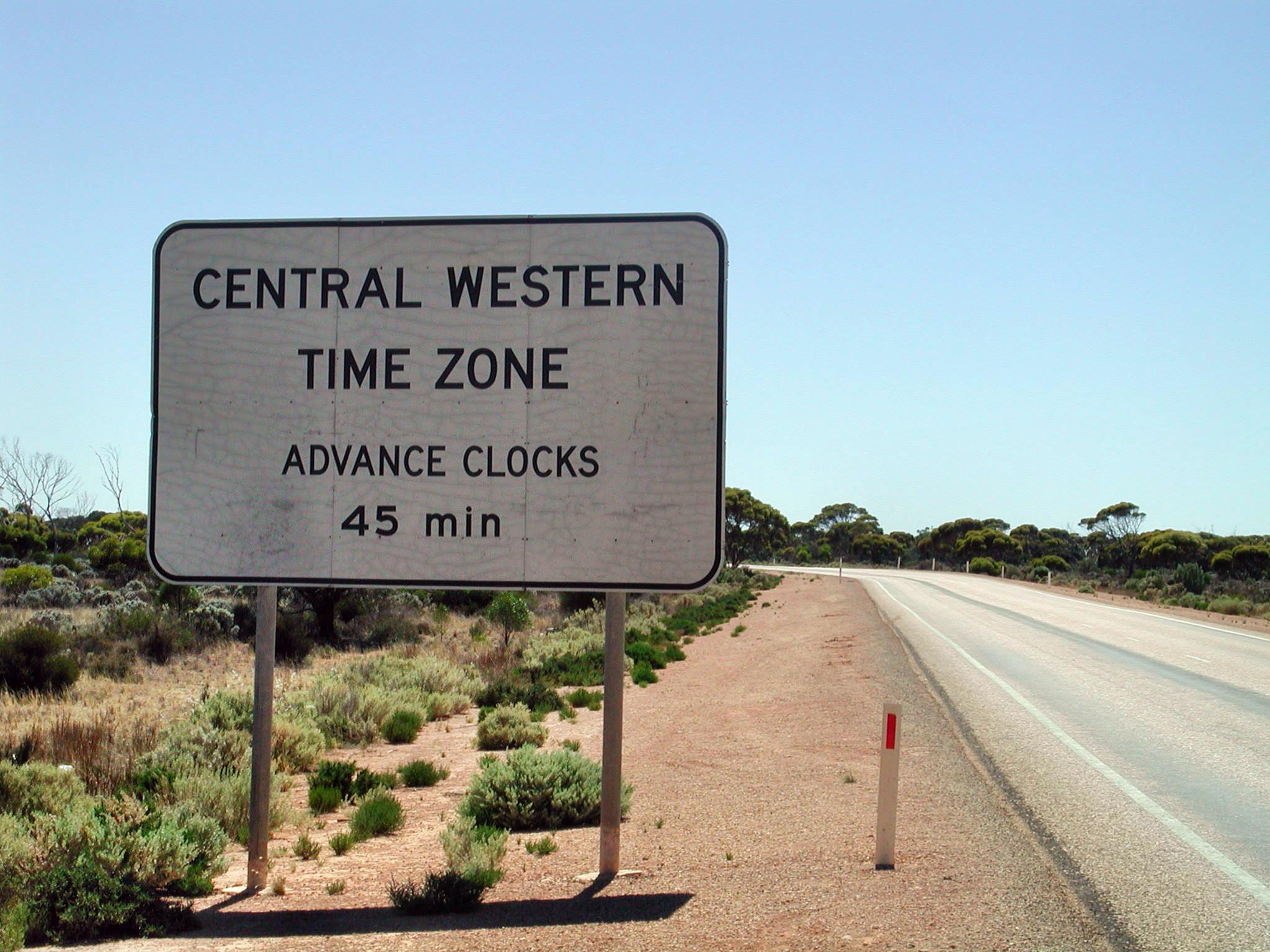
Sign on the Eyre highway indicating the start of the unofficial Australian Central Western Time Zone

UTC+08:45 is an identifier for a time offset from UTC of +08:45.

== As standard time (Southern Hemisphere winter) ==
Principal town: Eucla

=== Oceania ===
==== Pacific Ocean ====
===== Australasia =====
- Australia – Central Western Standard Time
  - Western Australia
    - Caiguna
    - Cocklebiddy
    - Eucla
    - Madura
    - Mundrabilla
  - South Australia
    - Border Village

== Usage ==
UTC+08:45 is used as a time in Australia, where it is called the Central Western Time (CWT). It is used by some roadhouses along the Eyre Highway in Western Australia and South Australia. Although not legally defined by the state or federal governments, the boundaries where it commences and ends are clearly understood and recognised by the Shire of Dundas local government and are frequently shown on road maps of the area. Road signs at the western end of the time zone on the Eyre Highway advise travellers to adjust their clocks by 45 minutes.

The use of this time zone dates back to at least 1935. The April 1935 Commonwealth Railways public timetable shows that 'Central Time' was used by that government organisation between Wynbring (in the East; Localities on the Trans-Australian Railway) and Rawlinna (in the West). Passengers were advised to advance/set back their watches by 45 minutes each night on their journey.

UTC+08:45 is used in five places in Australia, including Border Village in South Australia, as well as Cocklebiddy, Eucla, Madura and Mundrabilla in Western Australia. It runs from just east of the South Australian border to shortly east of Caiguna. It is included in the tz database with designator Australia/Eucla.

However, Arubiddy Station, northwest of Cocklebiddy, uses UTC+09:00.

== UTC+09:45 ==
In 2006, UTC+09:45 was used during summer in the areas using UTC+08:45.
