= Arubiddy Station =

Pastoral lease in Western Australia

Coordinates: 31.809°S 125.925°E

Location in Western Australia

Arubiddy Station is a pastoral lease that operates as a sheep station in Western Australia.

It is located 394 kilometres (245 mi) east of Norseman and 489 kilometres (304 mi) south east of Laverton on the Nullarbor Plain in the Goldfields–Esperance region.

The station occupies an area of 3,144 square kilometres (1,214 sq mi) and has a carrying capacity of 21,000 sheep. The station is composed of open grassland and saltbush with no salt lakes or heavy scrub, all divided into 44 well fenced paddocks that respond quickly after rain. The property has a machinery shed, a six stand woolshed, with extensive weldmesh yards and a drafting facility, and is fenced with 1,650 kilometres (1,025 mi) of fencing. No surface water sources exist and bores are used to water stock. There are a total of 12 bores with 127 kilometres (79 mi) of piping to distribute water about the property.

Arubiddy was established in 1961 along with other properties in the area, including Rawlinna, Kanandah and Moonera Stations, then later Kybo and Balgair were established.

The current homestead was built in 1969, constructed from brick and has three bedrooms, one bathroom and two loungerooms. Another cottage exists near the homestead with quarters for another twenty staff with mess facilities, known as the shearers' quarters. There is a two bedroom cottage also located near the homestead for an overseer. There is also a three bedroom house located near the highway for another staff member and their family.

The Brown family took over at Arubiddy in the 1970s and continued to improve the property. In 2003 a field trial involving the making of hay out of the native grass, speargrass (Austrostipa scabra), at Kanandah station had bales sent to Arubiddy to be used as feed for wethers. The station owners and managers, the Brown family, conducted the trial and found the feed to have environmental and economic benefits.

The property, along with a flock of 17,000 sheep, was passed in at auction in 2009 for A$2.8 million. Arubiddy Station was still on the market for sale as of September 2013.

By 2024, the station was owned by Matthew Lewis, who spoke with ABC Great Southern about operating in the UTC+09:00 time zone, distinct from the "Eucla Time" (UTC+08:45) used in nearby settlements.

== See also ==
- List of ranches and stations
- List of pastoral leases in Western Australia
