= Border Village =

- Town
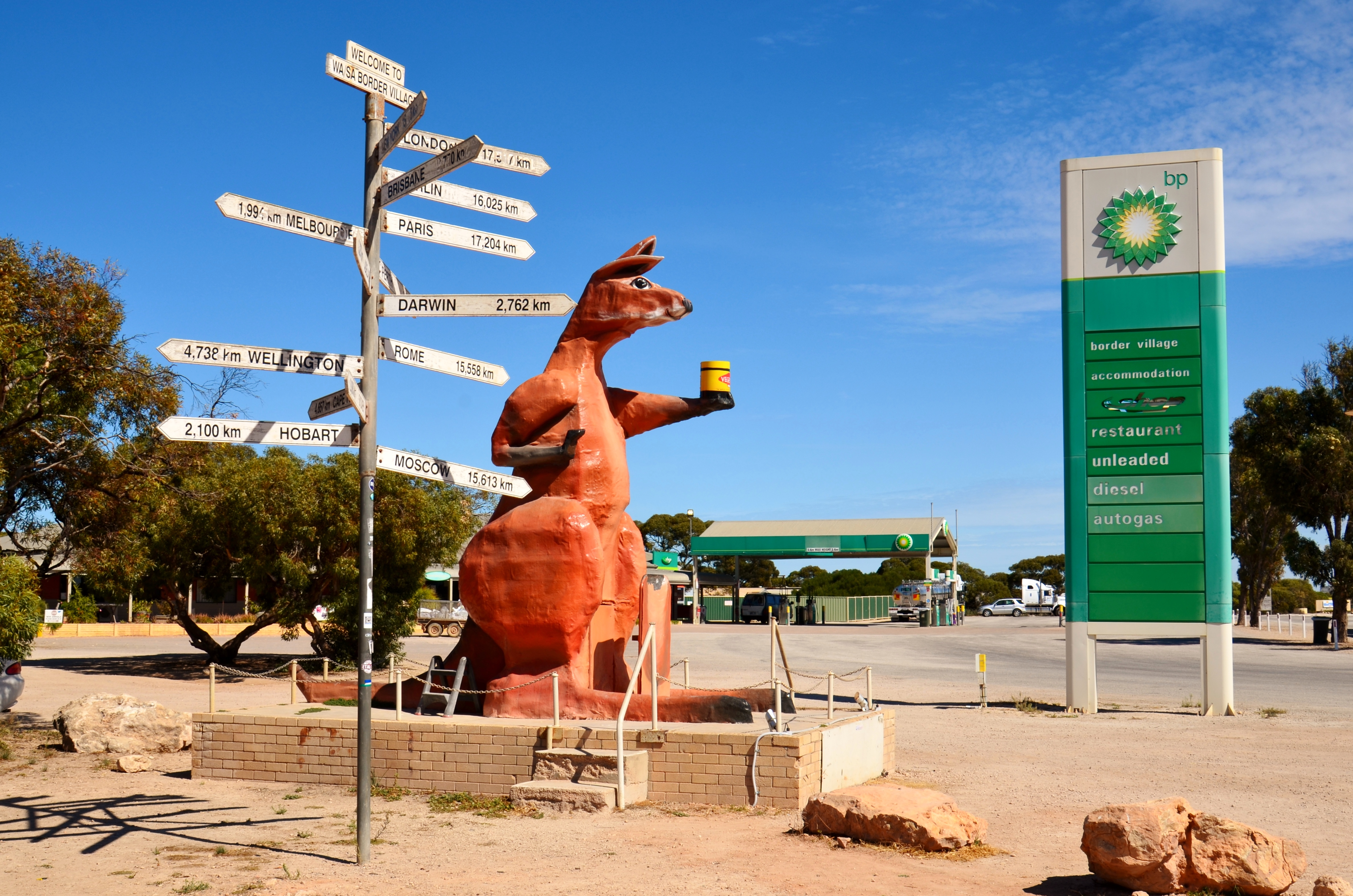
- Rooey II and the roadhouse, 2017

- Coordinates: 31°38′28″S 129°00′01″E
- Country: Australia
- State: South Australia
- City: Nullarbor
- LGA: Outback Communities Authority
- Location: 1,255 km (780 mi) W of Adelaide; 1,126 km (700 mi) E of Perth

Government
  - State electorate: Flinders
  - Federal division: Grey
- Time zone: UTC+8:45 (CWST)
- Postcode: 5690

Border Village is a settlement located in South Australia within the locality of Nullarbor on the Eyre Highway at the border with Western Australia.

The settlement, which is 12 km (7.5 mi) east of Eucla, was named in 1993 by the South Australian Geographical Names Advisory Committee following a suggestion provided by the Royal Automobile Club of Western Australia. The settlement is located about 5 kilometres (3.1 mi) north of the cliff line separating the Nullarbor Plain from the Great Australian Bight.

As of 2004, the settlement offered services to travellers and visitors to Nullarbor including:

Motel, cabin and caravan accommodation, a restaurant which opens from 6:00am – 10:00pm, a takeaway service which is open from 6:00am – 11:00pm, full garage service and a desalination plant which provides fresh water.

There is a Western Australian agricultural checkpoint at Border Village, and also "Hole 6: Border Kangaroo" of the Nullarbor Links golf course.

The settlement is one of five that uses the Central Western Standard Time (UTC+08:45).

== See also ==
- List of cities and towns in South Australia
