= Eucla, Western Australia =

Eucla
- Town
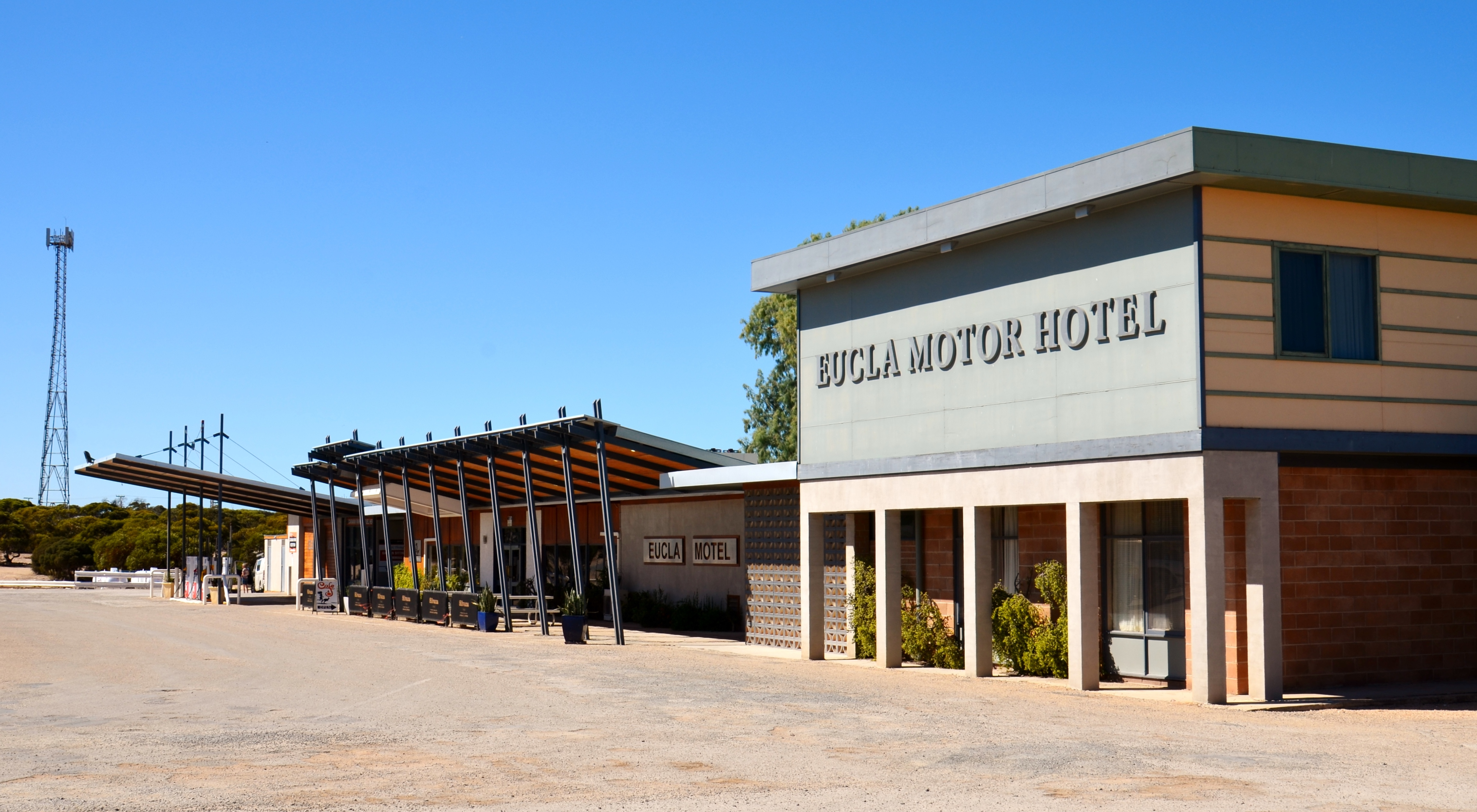
- Eucla Motor Hotel, 2017

- Interactive map of Eucla
- Coordinates: 31°40′30″S 128°52′59″E
- Country: Australia
- State: Western Australia
- LGA: Shire of Dundas
- Location: 1,434 km (891 mi) E of Perth; 893 km (555 mi) E of Kalgoorlie; 11 km (6.8 mi) W of WA-SA border; 492 km (306 mi) W of Ceduna; 709 km (441 mi) E of Norseman
- Established: 1877 (as a telegraph station)

Government
  - State electorate: Kalgoorlie
  - Federal division: O'Connor

Area
  - Total: 4,995.1 km^{2} (1,928.6 sq mi)
- Elevation: 93 m (305 ft)

Population
  - Total: 37 (SAL 2021)
- Time zone: UTC+8:45 (CWST (unofficial))
- Postcode: 6443
- Mean max temp: 23.5 °C (74.3 °F)
- Mean min temp: 12.4 °C (54.3 °F)
- Annual rainfall: 321.5 mm (12.66 in)

Eucla (/juːklə/ YOO-klə) is the easternmost locality in Western Australia, located in the Goldfields-Esperance region of Western Australia along the Eyre Highway, approximately 11 kilometres (7 mi) west of the South Australian border. At the 2016 Australian census, Eucla had a population of 53.

It is the only Western Australian location on the Eyre Highway that has a direct view of the Great Australian Bight due to its elevated position immediately next to the Eucla Pass – where the highway moves out and above the basin known as Roe Plains that occurs between the Madura and Eucla passes.

== History ==
The name Eucla is believed to originate from an Aboriginal word Yinculyer which one (uncited) source gives as referring to the rising of the planet Venus. It was first used by Europeans for the area at some point before 1867.

In 1841, Eyre and Baxter became the first European explorers to visit the area. In 1867, the president of the Marine Board of South Australia declared a port at Eucla, and in 1870, John Forrest camped at the location for nearly two weeks. In 1873, land was taken up at Moopina Station near the present townsite, and work commenced on a telegraph line from Albany to Adelaide. Land was set aside at Eucla for the establishment of a manual repeater station, and when the telegraph line opened in 1877, Eucla was one of the most important telegraph stations on the line. The station was important as a conversion point because South Australia and Victoria used American Morse code (locally known as the Victorian alphabet) while Western Australia used the international Morse code that is familiar today.

A jetty and tram line were constructed for offloading supplies brought in by sea. The town was proclaimed a township and gazetted in 1885, and reached its peak in the 1920s, prior to the construction of a new telegraph line further north alongside the Trans-Australian Railway in 1929.

In the 1890s, a rabbit plague passed through the area and ate much of the Delisser Sandhills' dune vegetation, thus destabilising the dune system and causing large sand drifts to encroach on the townsite. The original town was abandoned and a new townsite established about 4 km (2.5 mi) to the north and higher up on the escarpment. The ruins of the original telegraph station which still stand amongst the dunes are a local tourist attraction.

Many of the pioneer farmers and telegraph operators were buried at Eucla, but as the sand dunes encroached onto their graves, some of the headstones and plaques were removed and can now be seen at the museum at Eucla.

In 1898, the population of the town was 96 (82 males and 14 females).

In 1971, worldwide media publicity came to the town after reports (and indistinct photographs) emerged of a half-naked blonde girl who had gone wild and lived and ran with the kangaroos, who came to be known as the "Nullarbor Nymph". The story subsequently turned out to be a hoax created by the residents of the tiny settlement.

== Climate ==
Eucla has a semi-arid climate (BSk) with Mediterranean climate (Csb) tendencies. Summers are warm and dry, although mild by Australian outback standards. However, very hot days can occur, caused by hot northerly winds from the Great Victoria Desert. Winters are mild to cool with a rainfall peak. For a semi-desert climate the humidity is rather high all-year round, due to the moisture from the nearby ocean. With summers being right around 22 °C (72 °F) means, temperatures are near the border between maritime and subtropical climates, although Eucla is highly variable due to the combined cool-ocean and hot-desert influences.

Average maximum temperatures vary from 25 to 27 °C (77 to 81 °F) from December to March, to 18 °C (64 °F) in July. The average annual rainfall of 320.1 millimetres (12.60 in) is evenly spread through the year, with monthly totals ranging from 14.9 millimetres (0.59 in) in January to 35.0 millimetres (1.38 in) in December. The highest temperature was 49.8 °C (122 °F) on 19 December 2019, while the lowest was −2.2 °C (28 °F) on 20 June 1936.

Climate data for Eucla (1991–2020 averages, extremes 1910–present)
Month	Jan	Feb	Mar	Apr	May	Jun	Jul	Aug	Sep	Oct	Nov	Dec	Year
Record high °C (°F)	48.6 (119.5)	47.6 (117.7)	46.9 (116.4)	42.0 (107.6)	36.5 (97.7)	33.3 (91.9)	30.3 (86.5)	34.7 (94.5)	40.1 (104.2)	43.1 (109.6)	46.7 (116.1)	49.8 (121.6)	49.8 (121.6)
Mean maximum °C (°F)	43.3 (109.9)	41.4 (106.5)	39.3 (102.7)	34.7 (94.5)	30.6 (87.1)	25.2 (77.4)	25.6 (78.1)	29.9 (85.8)	34.7 (94.5)	38.8 (101.8)	40.3 (104.5)	41.5 (106.7)	45.0 (113.0)
Mean daily maximum °C (°F)	27.1 (80.8)	26.8 (80.2)	25.8 (78.4)	24.4 (75.9)	21.5 (70.7)	19.1 (66.4)	18.7 (65.7)	20.1 (68.2)	22.5 (72.5)	24.5 (76.1)	25.7 (78.3)	26.2 (79.2)	23.5 (74.3)
Daily mean °C (°F)	22.1 (71.8)	22.2 (72.0)	20.9 (69.6)	19.0 (66.2)	16.1 (61.0)	13.7 (56.7)	13.0 (55.4)	14.0 (57.2)	16.0 (60.8)	18.2 (64.8)	19.7 (67.5)	21.9 (71.4)	18.1 (64.5)
Mean daily minimum °C (°F)	17.0 (62.6)	17.5 (63.5)	15.9 (60.6)	13.6 (56.5)	10.7 (51.3)	8.3 (46.9)	7.3 (45.1)	7.9 (46.2)	9.5 (49.1)	11.9 (53.4)	13.7 (56.7)	15.5 (59.9)	12.4 (54.3)
Mean minimum °C (°F)	11.3 (52.3)	12.3 (54.1)	9.9 (49.8)	8.1 (46.6)	5.1 (41.2)	3.2 (37.8)	2.4 (36.3)	2.8 (37.0)	3.1 (37.6)	4.9 (40.8)	7.0 (44.6)	9.0 (48.2)	1.8 (35.2)
Record low °C (°F)	3.5 (38.3)	7.8 (46.0)	6.7 (44.1)	2.0 (35.6)	0.0 (32.0)	−2.2 (28.0)	−0.6 (30.9)	0.0 (32.0)	−0.6 (30.9)	1.5 (34.7)	2.8 (37.0)	3.8 (38.8)	−2.2 (28.0)
Average precipitation mm (inches)	22.5 (0.89)	20.4 (0.80)	30.9 (1.22)	29.0 (1.14)	28.4 (1.12)	32.8 (1.29)	25.5 (1.00)	29.6 (1.17)	27.2 (1.07)	17.7 (0.70)	25.4 (1.00)	32.1 (1.26)	321.5 (12.66)
Average precipitation days (≥ 1 mm)	2.9	2.5	4.6	4.3	6.0	6.3	5.9	5.1	4.5	3.6	3.8	3.8	53.3
Average afternoon relative humidity (%)	62	64	63	62	58	56	55	53	56	56	59	61	59
Source: Australian Bureau of Meteorology

== Present day ==
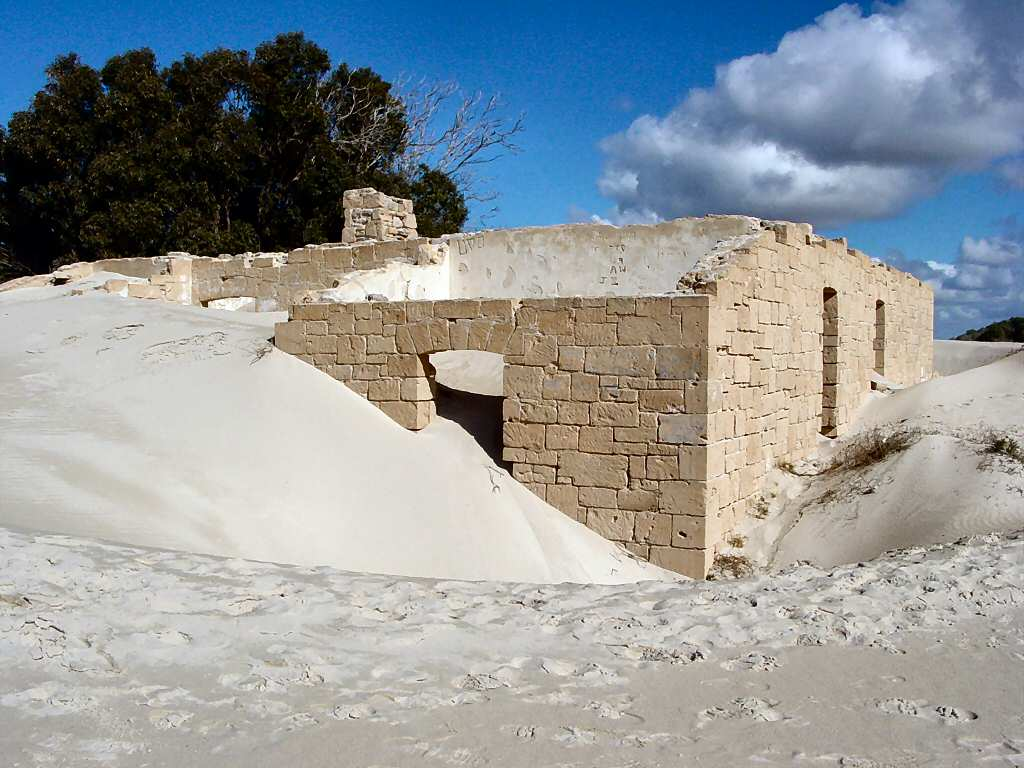
Telegraph Station

Eucla is the largest stopping point between Norseman and Penong for travellers along the Eyre Highway. It has a hotel and restaurant, a police station, a golf club (7 km (4 mi) to the north), a museum dedicated to the Old Telegraph Station, and a meteorological station. These, together with fishing, are the major activities in the locality. There is a Travellers Cross that, despite its name, commemorates locals who have died.

The South Australian settlement of Border Village is located 12 kilometres (7 mi) east of Eucla. Primarily established as a quarantine checkpoint for agricultural produce, this small settlement also comprises a licensed roadhouse and caravan park.

== Time zone ==
Eucla and the surrounding area, notably Mundrabilla and Madura in Western Australia and Border Village in South Australia, use the Central Western Time Zone of UTC+8:45. Although it has no official sanction, it is universally observed in this area, stopping just to the east of Caiguna.

== Transport ==
Eucla is a major stop-off point along the Eyre Highway.

In October 2005, Greyhound Australia announced the withdrawal of its Nullarbor Plain service due to rising fuel prices and declining passenger numbers. Eucla was served by Stateships services from Fremantle. In 1912 Stateships named a ship Eucla.

== Gallery ==
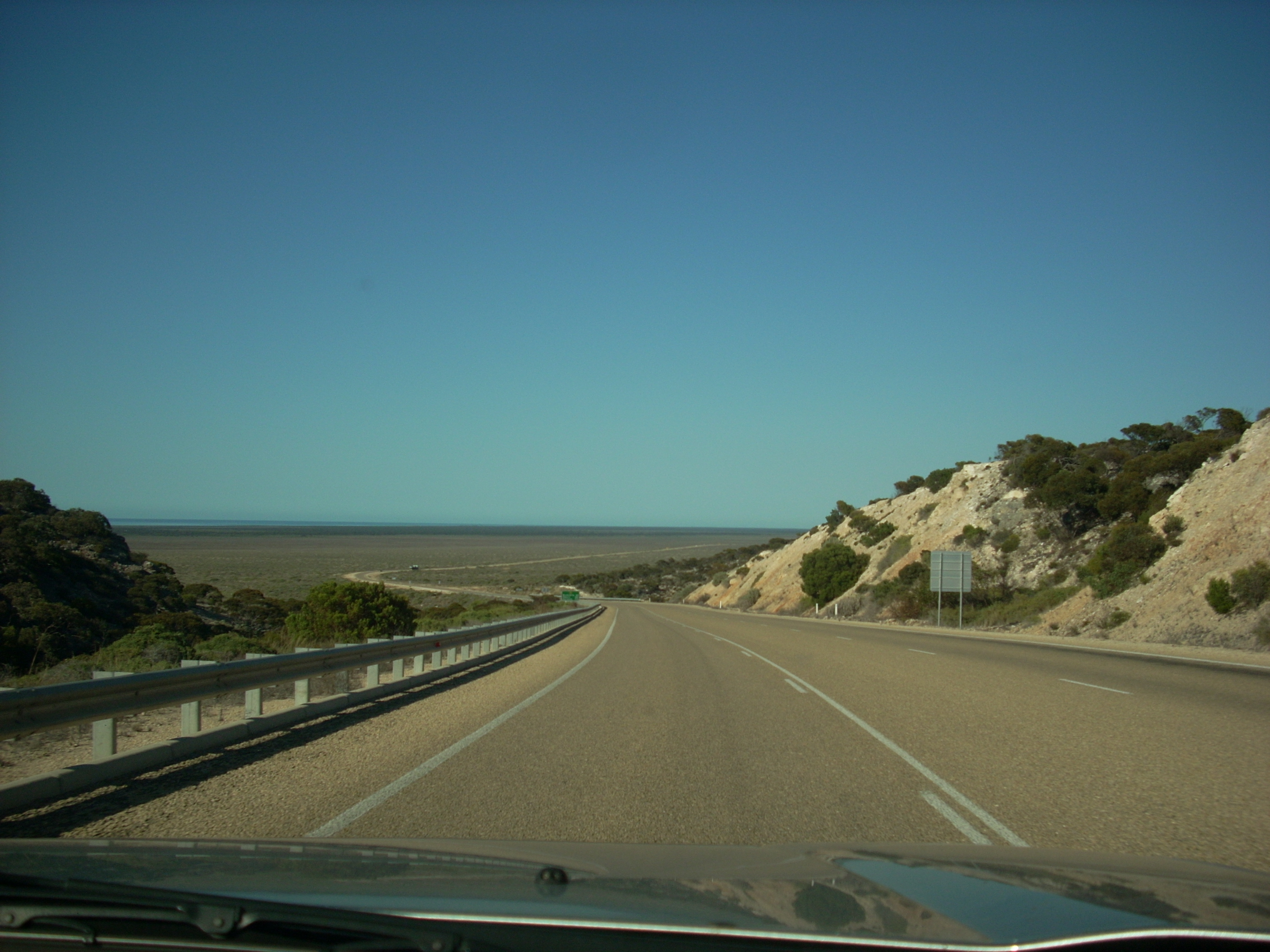
Eucla Pass

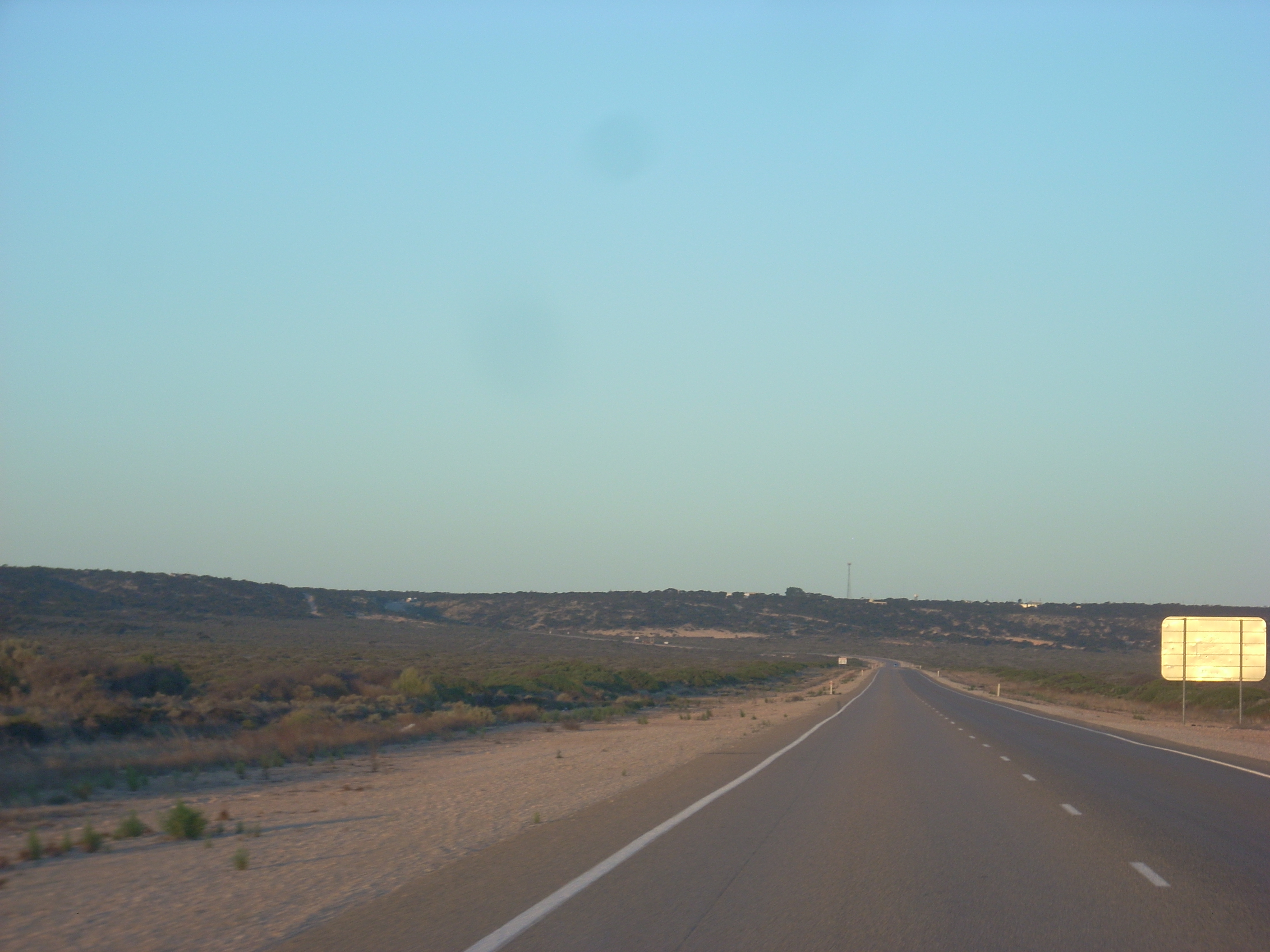
Eucla Pass from the west

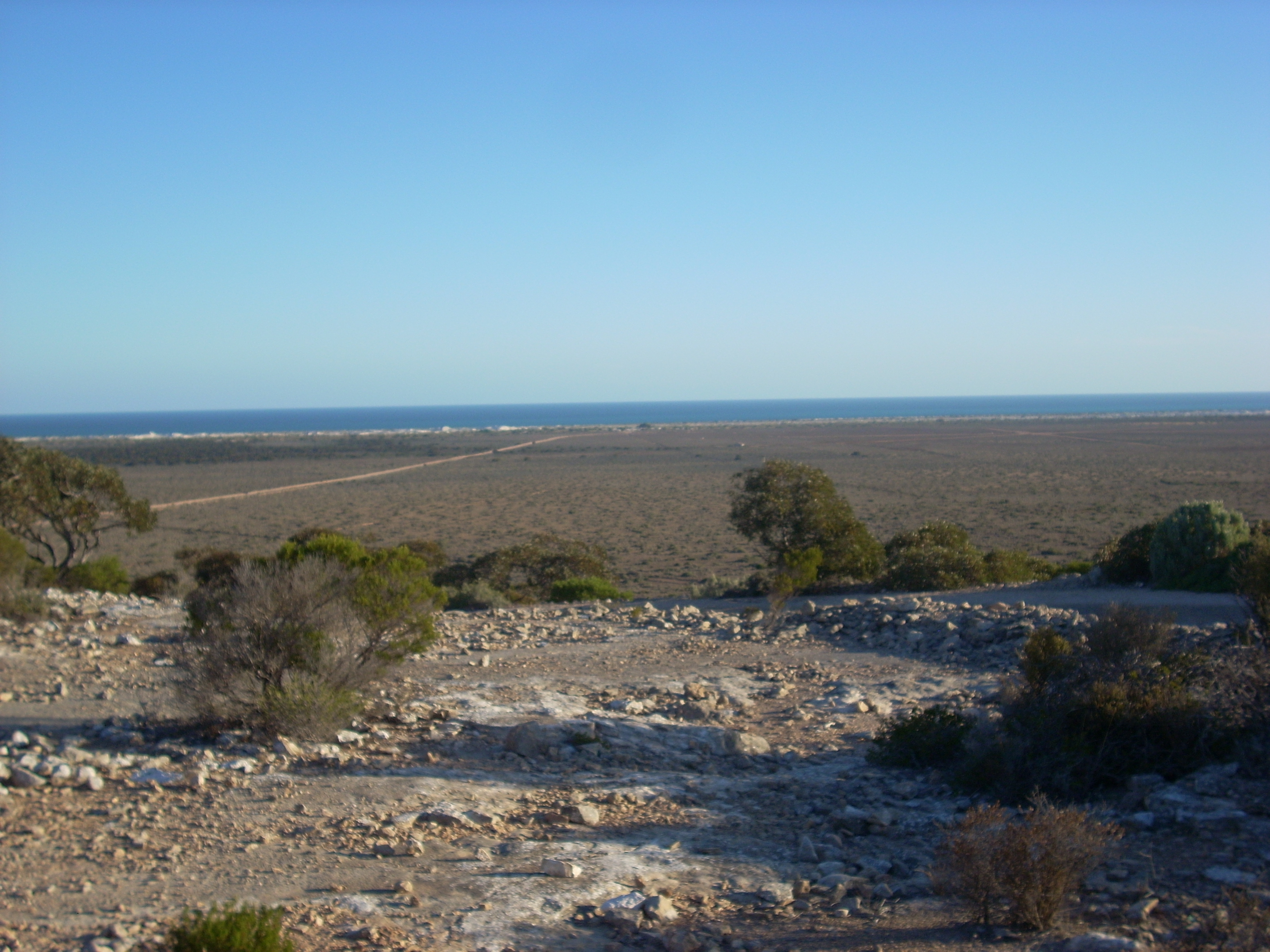
Eucla Pass looking toward south coast

== See also ==
- Eucla Airport
- Rabbits in Australia
- List of extreme temperatures in Australia
