= Madura, Western Australia =

Madura
- Town
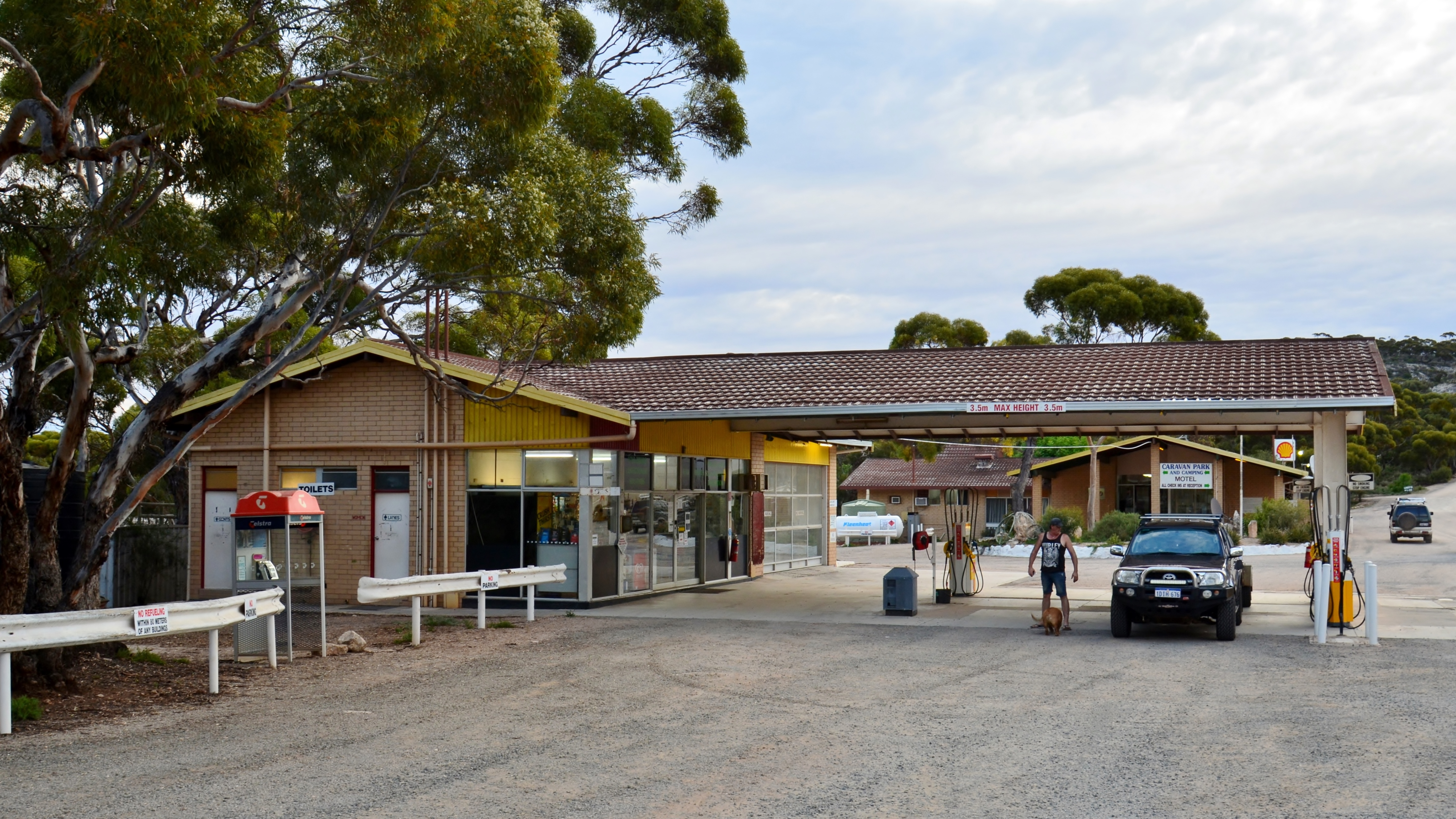
- Madura Roadhouse, 2017

- Interactive map of Madura
- Coordinates: 31°54′4″S 127°1′8″E
- Country: Australia
- State: Western Australia
- LGA: Shire of Dundas
- Location: 1,253 km (779 mi) E of Perth; 528 km (328 mi) E of Norseman; 183 km (114 mi) W of Eucla
- Established: 1876

Government
  - State electorate: Kalgoorlie
  - Federal division: O'Connor

Area
  - Total: 8,262.1 km^{2} (3,190.0 sq mi)
- Elevation: 46 m (151 ft)

Population
  - Total: 0 (SAL 2021)
- Postcode: 6443

Madura is a small roadhouse community located on the Eyre Highway in Western Australia, on the Roe Plains. It is 1,253 kilometres (779 mi) from Perth. It is at the foot of the escarpment next to the Madura Pass down from the Nullarbor Plain. UTC+8:45 is the local time zone in use.

== History ==
Madura was settled in 1876 as a place to breed quality cavalry horses for the British Indian Army for use in the Northwest Frontier region of India (now part of Pakistan). The horses were shipped from the coast at Eucla. (Cervantes, north of Perth, was also used for breeding.) The site was chosen as it was one of the few with free flowing bore water in the area.

The surrounding area is part of Madura Station, currently a sheep station, but previously used to graze cattle, horses and camels.

== Present day ==
Madura Pass climb from Roe Plains to lookout

Like other locations in the Nullarbor Plain area, the area consists of little more than a roadhouse, open 06:00 to 21:00 each day.

Two kilometres west of Madura is a scenic lookout with sweeping views of the Madura Pass across the escarpment and the Roe Plains. Natural blowholes may also be found nearby. The area is used for pastoral purposes, mainly sheep rearing.

Surrounding Madura is the Madura Shelf, 265,600 square kilometres (102,500 sq mi) of predominantly sedimentary rock, part of the Bight Basin, which has been found to contain crude oil and geothermal gradients.
