= Mundrabilla, Western Australia =

Community in Western Australia

Mundrabilla
- Town
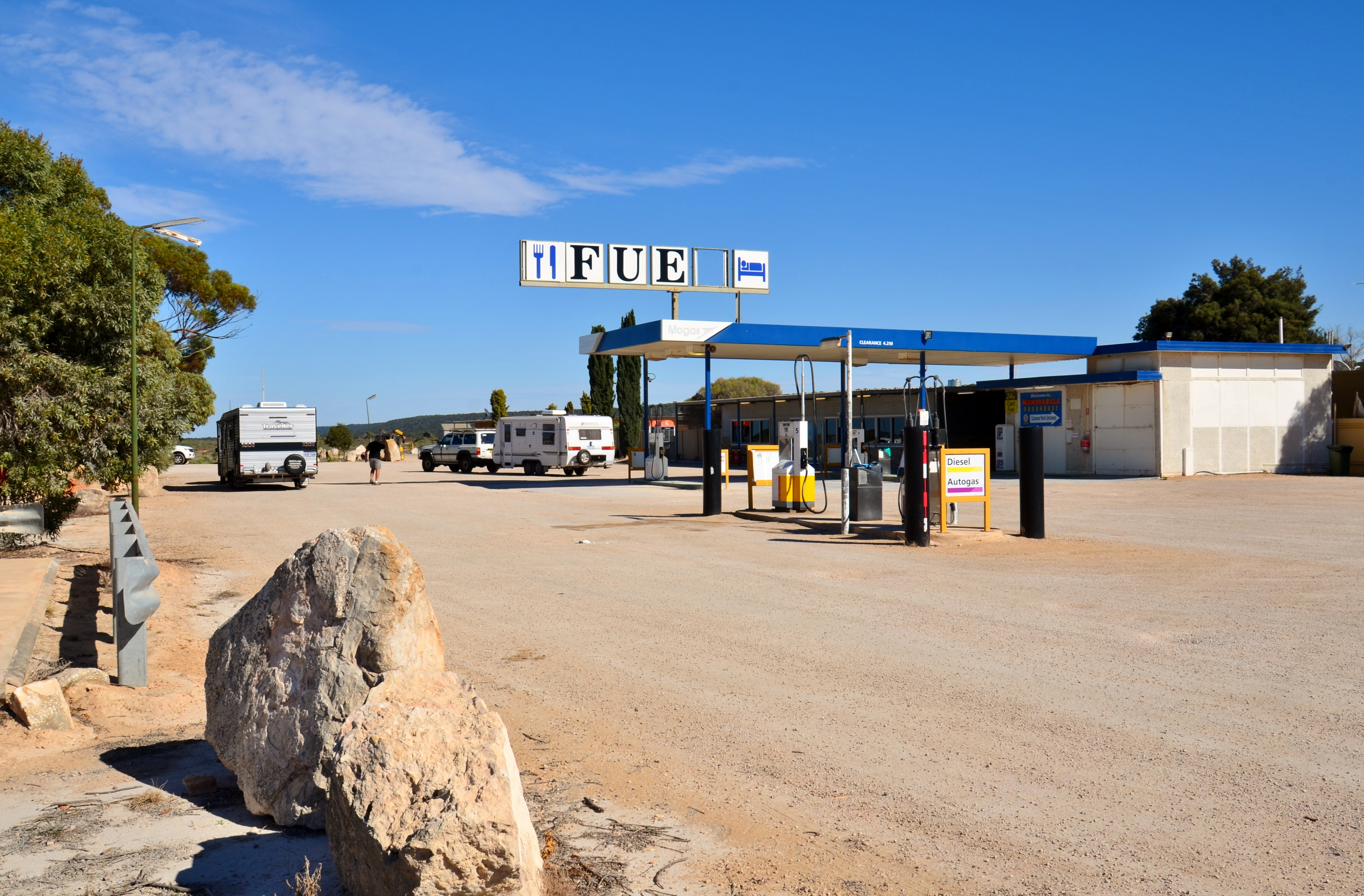
- Mundrabilla Roadhouse, 2017

- Interactive map of Mundrabilla
- Coordinates: 31°49′3.70″S 128°13′31.19″E
- Country: Australia
- State: Western Australia
- LGA: Shire of Dundas
- Location: 1,368 km (850 mi) from Perth; 644 km (400 mi) from Norseman; 67 km (42 mi) from Eucla
- Established: 1872

Government
  - State electorate: Kalgoorlie
  - Federal division: O'Connor

Area
  - Total: 6,292 km^{2} (2,429 sq mi)
- Elevation: 20 m (66 ft)

Population
  - Total: 11 (SAL 2021)
- Postcode: 6443
- Mean max temp: 24.6 °C (76.3 °F)
- Mean min temp: 11.2 °C (52.2 °F)
- Annual rainfall: 237.4 mm (9.35 in)

Mundrabilla is in a very sparsely populated area in the far south east of Western Australia. The two significant features are Mundrabilla Roadhouse and Mundrabilla Station, which are approximately 35 kilometres (22 mi) apart. At the 2016 census, Mundrabilla had a population of 23, 32% male and 68% female. The time zone in use is UTC+08:45.

== Mundrabilla Roadhouse ==
Mundrabilla Roadhouse was built by Roger and Pat Warren-Langford, who initially managed Mundrabilla Station. It is now a small roadhouse community located on the Eyre Highway in Western Australia, on the Roe Plains (at a lower level and south of the Nullarbor Plain), 66 kilometres (41 mi) west of Eucla and about 20 kilometres (12 mi) north of the Great Australian Bight.

== Mundrabilla Station ==
Mundrabilla Station (31°50′34.55″S 127°51′25.09″E), the first sheep station in the Nullarbor region, was established by William Stuart McGill (a Scotsman) and Thomas and William Kennedy (two Irishmen) in 1872. Thomas Kennedy died in 1896. McGill's first wife Annie Harkness (née Crawford) died in childbirth in 1879. Annie McGill and Thomas Kennedy are both buried on Mundrabilla Station. McGill remarried Ellen Angel Fairweather of Adelaide in 1889.

== Climate ==
Mundrabilla has a typical arid climate; however it is cooler in summer than much of the Australian desert due to its proximity to the ocean. Despite this, Mundrabilla Station still holds the record for the equal 6th-hottest temperature in Australia, 49.8 °C (121.6 °F) recorded on 3 January 1979.

Climate data for Mundrabilla Station
Month	Jan	Feb	Mar	Apr	May	Jun	Jul	Aug	Sep	Oct	Nov	Dec	Year
Record high °C (°F)	49.8 (121.6)	48.6 (119.5)	44.8 (112.6)	40.4 (104.7)	36.4 (97.5)	27.6 (81.7)	30.1 (86.2)	33.5 (92.3)	39.0 (102.2)	43.1 (109.6)	46.0 (114.8)	45.7 (114.3)	49.8 (121.6)
Mean daily maximum °C (°F)	29.6 (85.3)	29.4 (84.9)	27.4 (81.3)	26.0 (78.8)	22.2 (72.0)	19.5 (67.1)	19.2 (66.6)	20.5 (68.9)	22.5 (72.5)	25.5 (77.9)	27.3 (81.1)	28.7 (83.7)	24.8 (76.6)
Mean daily minimum °C (°F)	15.7 (60.3)	15.9 (60.6)	14.7 (58.5)	12.5 (54.5)	10.3 (50.5)	8.0 (46.4)	7.0 (44.6)	7.3 (45.1)	8.3 (46.9)	10.5 (50.9)	12.2 (54.0)	13.7 (56.7)	11.3 (52.3)
Record low °C (°F)	8.3 (46.9)	3.9 (39.0)	7.3 (45.1)	4.2 (39.6)	2.7 (36.9)	0.1 (32.2)	−1.0 (30.2)	−0.2 (31.6)	−1.2 (29.8)	0.2 (32.4)	2.7 (36.9)	6.5 (43.7)	−1.2 (29.8)
Average rainfall mm (inches)	15.9 (0.63)	19.2 (0.76)	19.3 (0.76)	21.4 (0.84)	25.9 (1.02)	25.9 (1.02)	22.2 (0.87)	22.9 (0.90)	18.8 (0.74)	18.3 (0.72)	16.0 (0.63)	18.2 (0.72)	244 (9.61)
Average rainy days (≥ 0.2mm)	2.6	3.3	4.6	5.2	7.8	8.2	7.7	7.2	5.6	4.2	3.5	3.2	63.1
Source: Bureau of Meteorology

== Present day ==
Like other locations in the Nullarbor Plain area, the area consists of nothing more than a roadhouse, open 6:00 am to 9:30 pm each day. The roadhouse includes a small wildlife park with emus, camels and an aviary. Pastoral activities continue in the area.

== Meteorite ==
The Mundrabilla meteorite, the largest meteorite found in Australia, weighing 12.4 tonnes (12.2 long tons; 13.7 short tons), was found by geologists R.B. Wilson and A.M. Cooney during a geological survey at Mundrabilla in 1966, and forms one half of the "Mundrabilla Mass". The next largest fragment weighs 5.08 tonnes (5.00 long tons; 5.60 short tons). In all, 22 tonnes (22 long tons; 24 short tons) of fragments have been recovered, spread over a 60 km (37 mi) range making it one of the largest meteorite sites in the world. The fragments fell to Earth at least one million years ago.

== See also ==
- List of extreme temperatures in Australia
