= Caiguna, Western Australia =

Caiguna
- Town
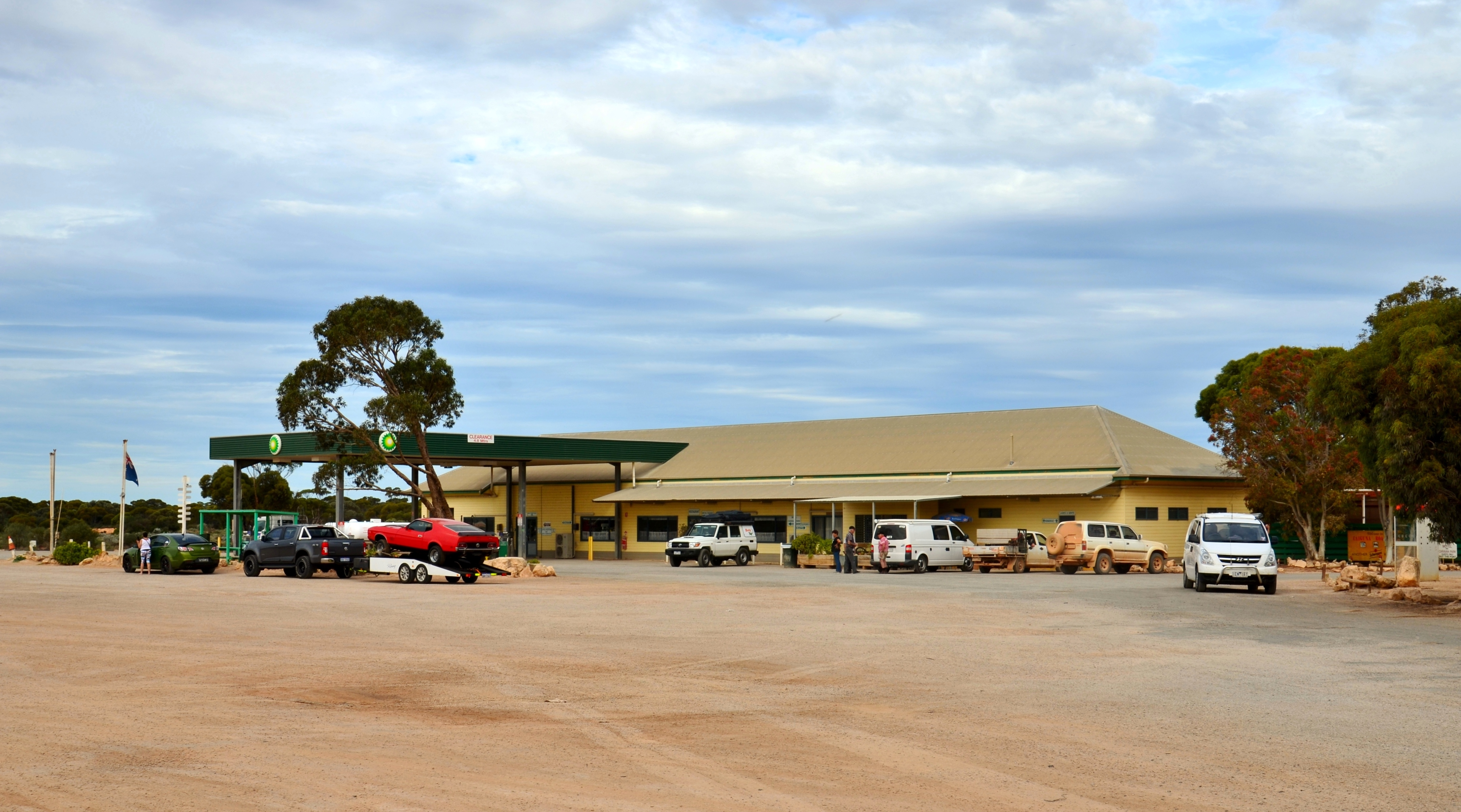
- Caiguna Roadhouse

- Interactive map of Caiguna
- Coordinates: 32°16′8″S 125°29′24″E
- Country: Australia
- State: Western Australia
- LGA: Shire of Dundas
- Location: 1,098 km (682 mi) from Perth; 374 km (232 mi) from Norseman; 336 km (209 mi) from Eucla
- Established: 1962

Government
  - State electorate: Kalgoorlie
  - Federal division: O'Connor

Area
  - Total: 13,709.8 km^{2} (5,293.4 sq mi)
- Elevation: 110 m (360 ft)

Population
  - Total: 4 (SAL 2021)
- Postcode: 6443

Caiguna (/kaɪɡuːnə/ KY-GOO-na) is a small roadhouse community located on the Eyre Highway in Western Australia. It is the second stop east of Norseman on the journey east across the Nullarbor Plain. Between Balladonia and Caiguna is a 146.6-kilometre (91.1 mi) stretch of the highway which is one of the longest straight stretches of road in the world. The unofficial Central Western Time (CWT) starts shortly east of Caiguna, heading eastward towards the Western Australia - South Australia Border. Caiguna comes under the jurisdiction of the Shire of Dundas.

== History ==
The name is an Aboriginal word possibly meaning "spear track". In 1841, Edward John Eyre's party, consisting of Eyre, a man named John Baxter and three Aboriginals including one named Wylie, travelled across the Nullarbor, leaving Fowler's Bay in South Australia. On 29 April, two of the Aboriginals killed John Baxter and disappeared into the desert, taking most of the party's supplies. Due to the terrain, Baxter could not be buried, so his remains were wrapped in a blanket and left behind, and Eyre and Wylie pressed on for another month, after which they were rescued by a French vessel off Thistle Cove near modern-day Esperance, Western Australia. A memorial to Baxter is located 10-kilometre (6.2 mi) south of the roadhouse.

The townsite was established in 1962 to assist traffic crossing the Nullarbor for the Commonwealth Games in Perth.

During the 1960s and 1970s, Ansett and Trans Australia Airlines domestic flights used a VOR station at Caiguna as a turning point on routes between Perth and eastern Australian capitals such as Adelaide, Melbourne, and Sydney.

=== Present day ===
As with other communities along the Eyre Highway, Caiguna today consists of little more than a roadhouse. The John Eyre Motel provides roadhouse facilities including a basic caravan park, and is one of only three Nullarbor roadhouses to be open 24 hours. A landing strip is located nearby and connects to the roadhouse with a short taxiway. The John Eyre Motel hosts a 310-metre (339.0 yd) par 4 golf tee as part of the Nullarbor Links golf course.

There are several nearby attractions for people crossing the Nullarbor Plain. Numerous rockholes, blowholes, and gnamma holes are located on tracks off of the Eyre Highway in the vicinity of Caiguna, including the Caiguna Blowhole, and the Jillbunya and Cardanumbi Rockholes. These features were formed by years of chemical and physical weathering of the limestone bedrock of the Nullarbor Plain.

The Readymix logo geoglyph, created during the sealing of the Eyre Highway, lies around 13 kilometres (8.1 miles) north west of Caiguna.

Nuytsland Nature Reserve stretches along the coast of the Great Australian Bight directly south of Caiguna and contains numerous points of interest, including a Memorial to John Baxter and Toolinna Cove.

== Geography ==
=== Climate ===
Caiguna experiences a steppe climate (Köppen climate classification BSk). The climate is generally mild with small seasonal variation. Summers average 27 °C (81 °F) highs and winters about 18 °C (64 °F) during afternoons. Nights are seldom hot due to the cool ocean air from the south.

Climate data for Eyre
Month	Jan	Feb	Mar	Apr	May	Jun	Jul	Aug	Sep	Oct	Nov	Dec	Year
Mean daily maximum °C (°F)	26.6 (79.9)	26.6 (79.9)	25.7 (78.3)	24.2 (75.6)	21.4 (70.5)	19.0 (66.2)	18.3 (64.9)	19.5 (67.1)	21.4 (70.5)	23.3 (73.9)	24.5 (76.1)	25.6 (78.1)	23.0 (73.4)
Mean daily minimum °C (°F)	15.3 (59.5)	16.0 (60.8)	14.2 (57.6)	11.8 (53.2)	9.0 (48.2)	6.7 (44.1)	5.7 (42.3)	6.0 (42.8)	7.6 (45.7)	10.1 (50.2)	12.1 (53.8)	14.1 (57.4)	10.7 (51.3)
Average precipitation mm (inches)	17.4 (0.69)	19.5 (0.77)	27.3 (1.07)	24.6 (0.97)	38.2 (1.50)	39.6 (1.56)	34.8 (1.37)	29.6 (1.17)	23.6 (0.93)	19.7 (0.78)	21.3 (0.84)	21.1 (0.83)	316.2 (12.45)
Source: Australian Bureau of Meteorology
