= History of telegraphy in Australia =

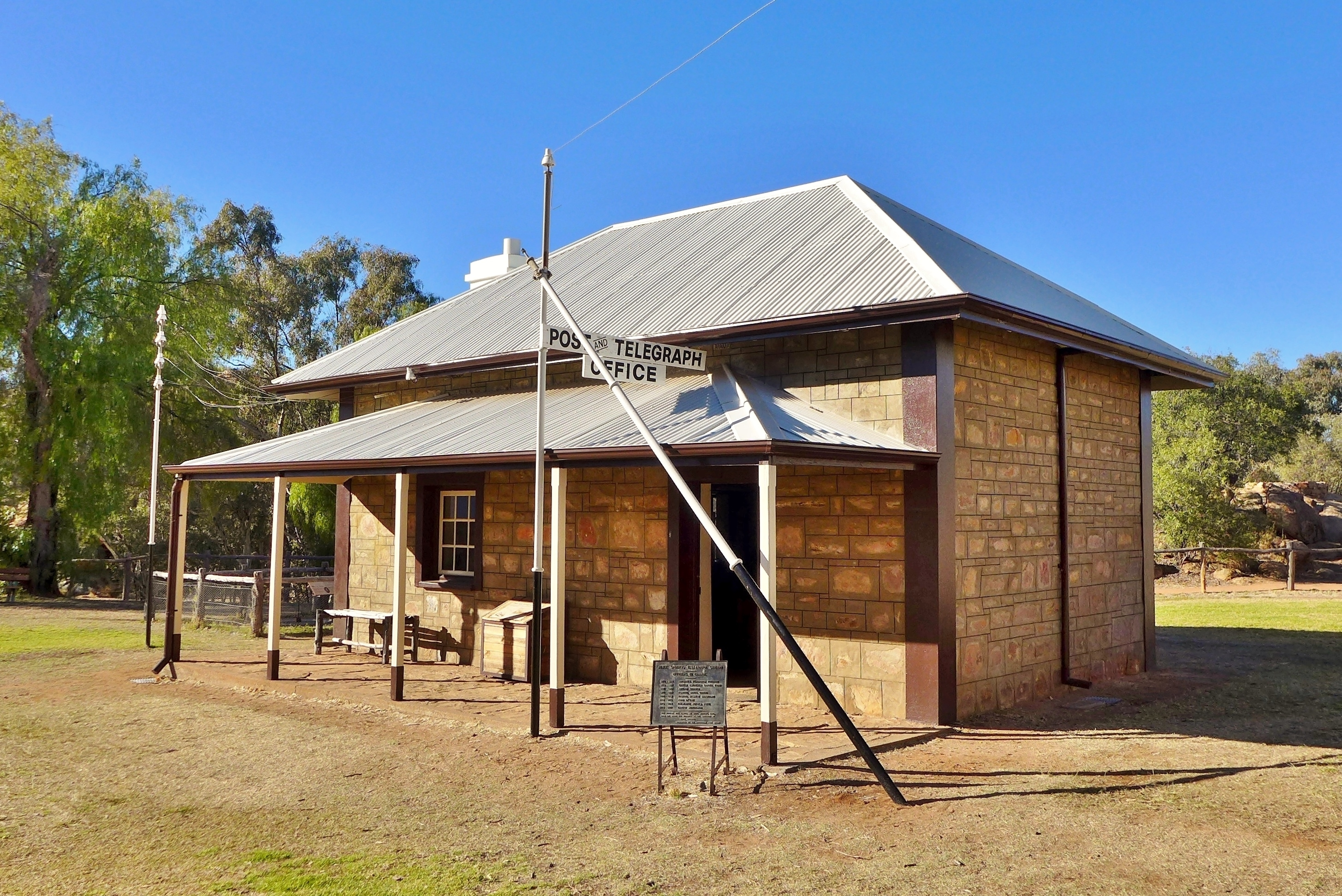
Alice Springs Telegraph Station

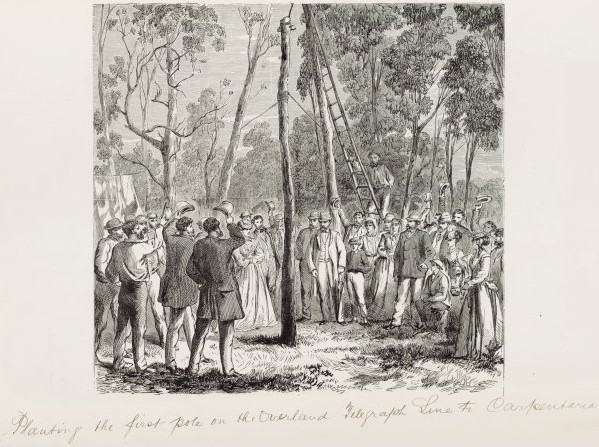
Planting the first pole on the Overland Telegraph line to Carpentaria

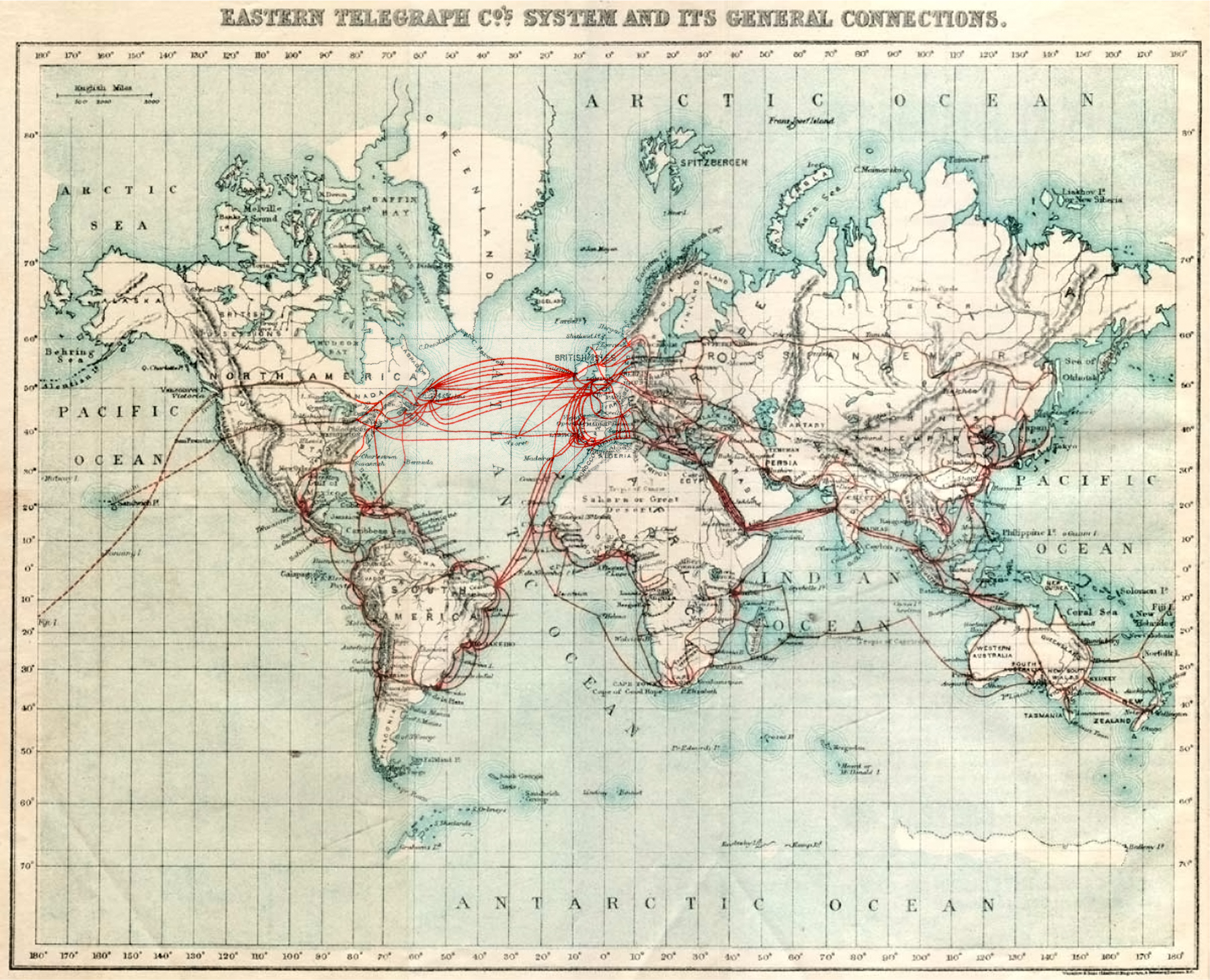
World map of telegraph density

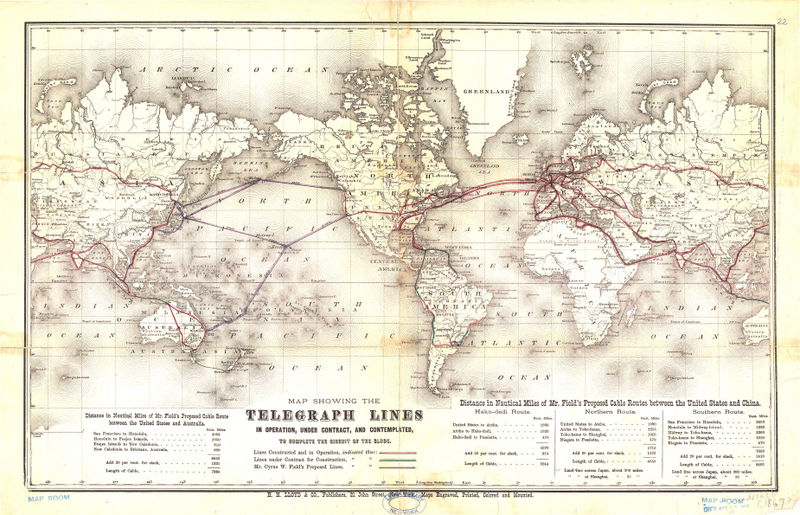
World map of telegraph density

Australia was a relatively early adopter of electrical telegraph technology in the middle of the nineteenth century, despite its low population densities and the difficult conditions sometimes encountered in laying lines. From 1858 onwards, the major capitals were progressively linked, culminating in the addition of Perth in 1877. Australia was linked to the rest of the world for the first time in 1872, through the Overland Telegraph which ran some 3,200 kilometres (2,000 mi) from Adelaide through to Darwin. The network continued to expand in size and sophistication until 1959 and in heavy usage until 1945, after which time telephone usage began to erode public patronage of telegraphy services. The final publicly provided telegraphy service was closed in 1993.

== Electric telegraphy ==
The telegraph is a device for transmitting and receiving messages over long distances, i.e., for telegraphy, which is the long-distance transmission of textual messages where the sender uses a semaphore system, known to the recipient.

An electrical telegraph uses electric current and magnetism to convert the manual typing of codes that represent words, into electrical impulses. These impulses are transmitted over a metallic circuit (overhead wires or underground cables) to a distant location. At the distant location the impulses are converted into magnetic fields that operate a mechanical device to make a sound or to move a visual indicator. The operator at the receiving end converts these sounds or signals into a written message. The code system used throughout Australia was the Morse code.

== Beginnings ==
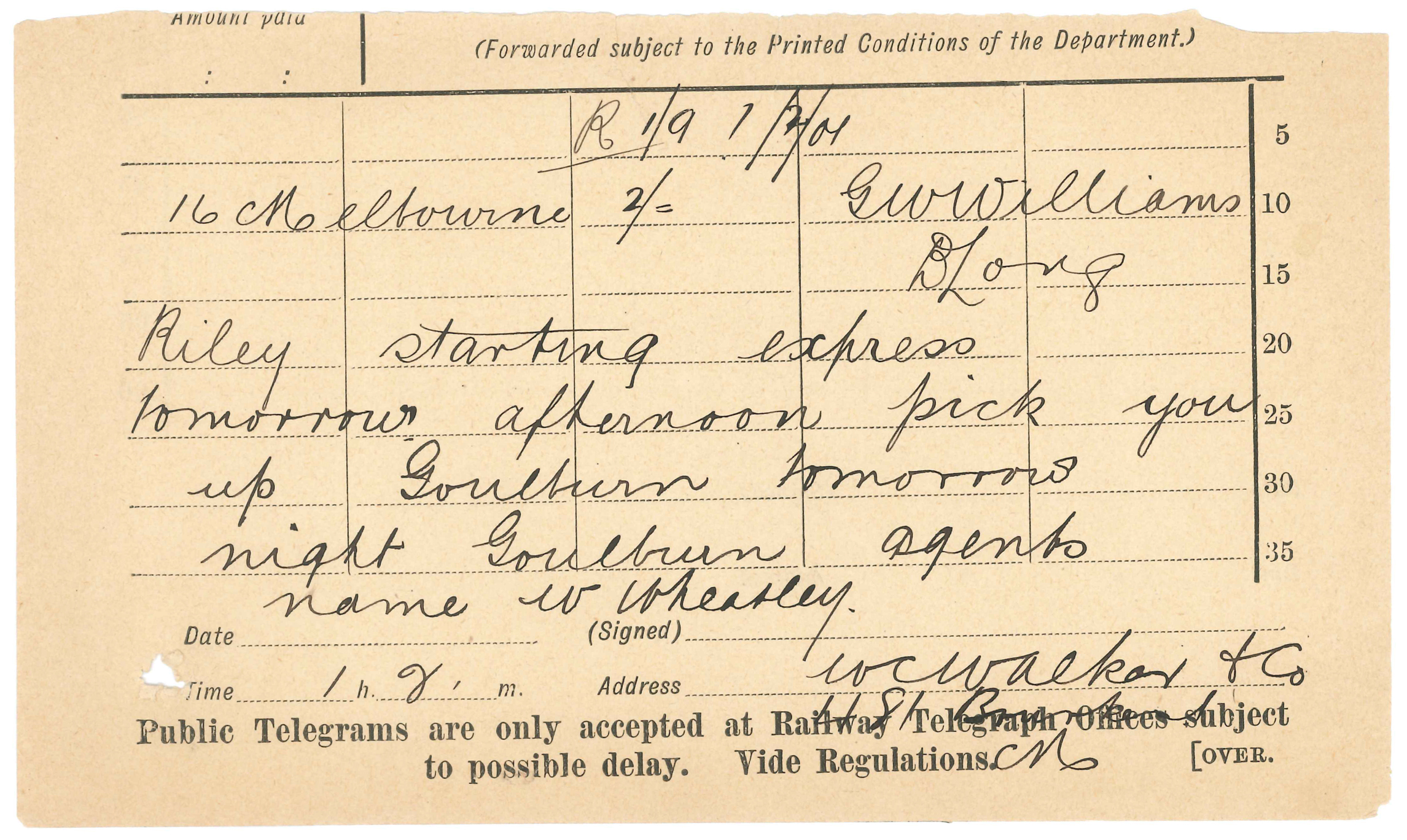
A telegram slip from Binalong telegraph office from February 1901

=== Victoria ===
Australia's first telegraph line, sponsored by the Victorian government, was erected between Melbourne and Williamstown in 1853 and 1854 by Samuel McGowan, a recently immigrated Canadian telegrapher. The line covered a distance of 17 kilometres (11 mi) and went into operation in March 1854, less than 10 years after the opening of the first public telegraph line (1 May 1844) in the world (linking Baltimore and Washington DC). 4000 telegrams were despatched in the first year (1854). When the line was extended to Geelong in December 1854, the first message transmitted to Melbourne brought news of the Eureka Stockade. Connections to Queenscliff and Port Melbourne (January and July 1855) provided notice of ships entering the harbour and arriving at port. Connections to the gold-mining centres of Ballarat and Bendigo were both completed in December 1856. By 1857 Victoria had been extensively networked by telegraph lines, including a line reaching to Portland, near the South Australian state border. By 1867 there were 1,676 miles (2,697 km) of line within Victoria, handling 122,138 messages.

=== South Australia ===
Late 1854 the South Australian government sought help from the Colonial Office in London to find a suitable superintendent of telegraphs. Their choice was Charles Todd, who arrived in Adelaide on 5 November 1855. One of his first tasks was the long-promised Adelaide–Semaphore telegraph line, for which architect James Macgeorge had stolen a march, avoiding Government restrictions by running the (single) wire away from the main road and railway. Macgeorge's telegraph (which used Cooke and Wheatstone's "Electric" patent equipment) was working by 26 November 1855 and began commercial operation on 10 December. Todd's line, which was more direct and technically superior, and vastly more expensive (even without the observatory and time ball for accurate time signals), went into operation using Henley's "Magnetic" patent in February 1856 and by February 1857 Macgeorge's was redundant.

Critical to the progress of South Australia was a connection to Melbourne and in 1857 Todd made arrangements with Samuel McGowan to build a uniform system between the capitals. Both Todd and McGowan dreamt that their proposed intercolonial interconnection would one day be a key link in a chain leading to 'a step in the direction of our ultimate telegraph communications, via India, with England, a scheme vast and difficult [that] will, we doubt not, at no very distant date be carried out'. The Adelaide to Melbourne connection was begun in April 1857 and completed in July 1858. This included a 300 km South Australian section built at that colony's expense. So heavily used was the first telegraph line to Melbourne that Todd reported to the government that a second line was needed. The second line was built via Wellington, South Australia and was opened in 1861.

=== Tasmania ===
A telegraph line connecting Hobart and Launceston was completed in 1857. Connections were quickly built to remote areas through dense terrain from Launceston to George Town in March 1858 and easier lines from Hobart to Mt Nelson in July, and Low Head in October 1858. Again, like South Australia the key to future growth in trade and commerce was a connection to the other state capitals. This required a submarine cable and discussions were held between the Victorian and Tasmanian Governments during 1856. At this time the technology to build an undersea cable was in its infancy and overseas experience advised caution. Tasmania and Victoria agreed to share the costs and a contract was signed February 1858. 188 kilometres (117 mi) of cable at a final contract cost of £53,000 was laid and made operational on 18 August 1859. Unfortunately the cable was constantly out of service due to faults undersea and by January 1861 it was abandoned. An enduring cable link was established between Cape Otway on the Victorian mid-south coast, through to King Island and, ultimately, Launceston, Tasmania, the £70000 cost paid fully by the Tasmanian Government and it was opened in 1869. It was a great success and the cable was duplicated in 1885 and again in 1909.

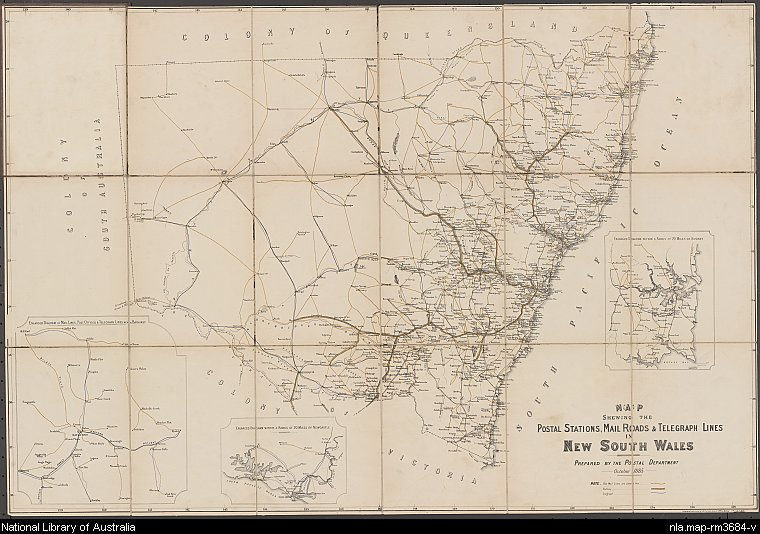
NSW Telegraph Routes (in blue) October 1885

=== New South Wales ===
The New South Wales government commenced construction of the Sydney to Liverpool telegraph line, a distance of 32 kilometres (20 mi), which opened on 30 December 1857. Edward Charles Cracknell was appointed Assistant Superintendent of Telegraphs in January 1858 and Superintendent in 1861.

The Liverpool line was extended to Albury on the NSW/Victorian border, a distance of 322 kilometres (200 mi), in October 1858. This line connected with a line from Melbourne thus linking the two capitals. At this time Sydney – Melbourne and Adelaide became connected by telegraph. In 1867 the first direct line linking Adelaide and Sydney was opened.

=== Queensland ===
Queensland's separation from New South Wales created a position for Superintendent of Telegraphs which was filled by W.J Cracknell, the brother of the New South Wales Superintendent. Tenders were called for a line from Brisbane to the NSW border in September 1860, completed to Ipswich in April 1861 and working to the border by November 1861. This connected to a recently completed line from Sydney. Now four state capitals were connected. Lines were pushed out from Brisbane north to Rockhampton, reached Port Denison (Bowen) in 1866, and Cardwell in June 1869. At the same time extending inland to the newly established pastoral areas. In 1855 the Electric Telegraph department handled over 50000 telegrams and messages could pass over 1,600 kilometres (990 mi) of telegraph lines within the state. In Queensland the last Morse Code message was to Thursday Island via combined landline and radio link in 1964.

=== Western Australia ===
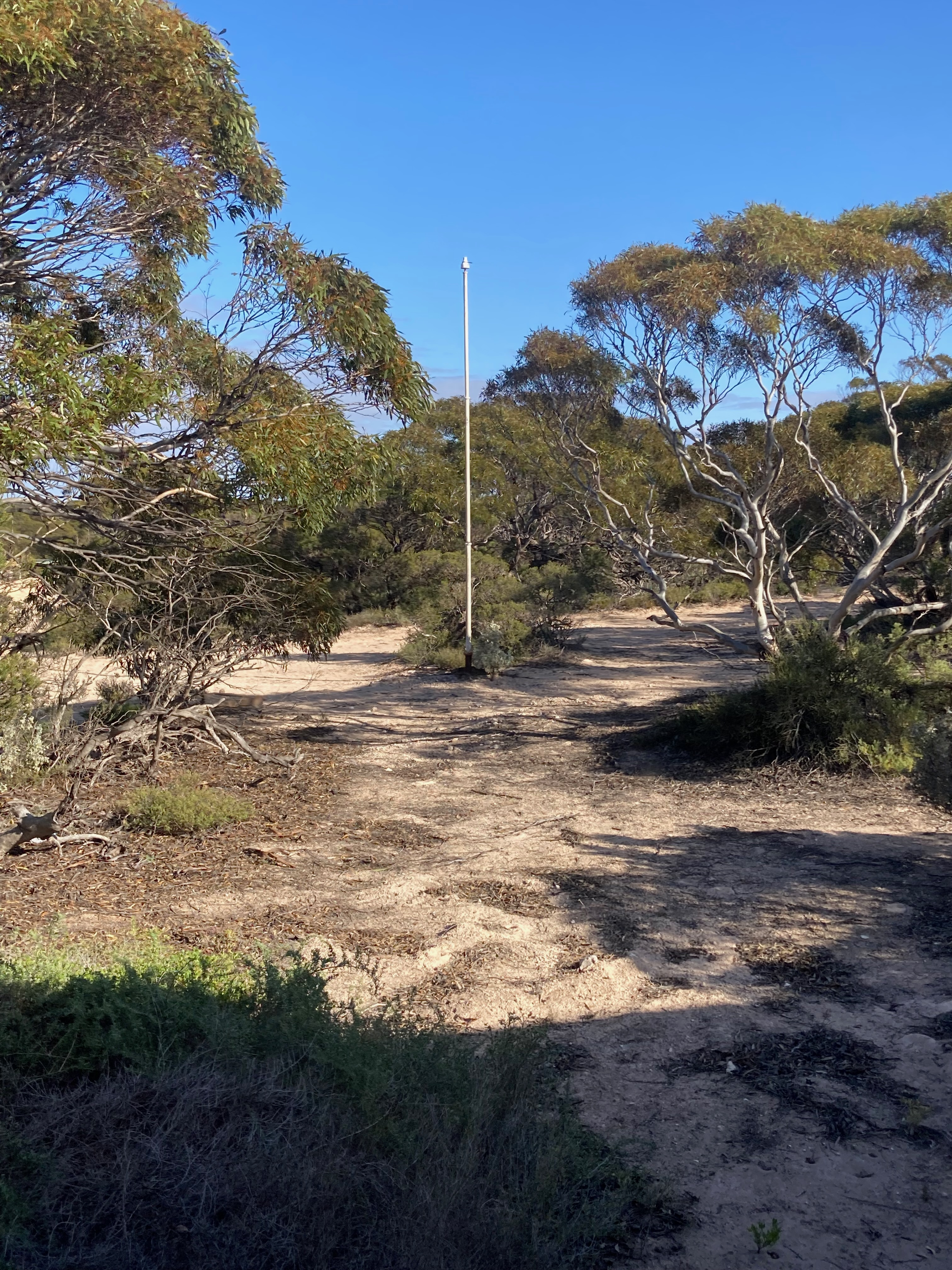
Remnant of the east–west telegraph line at Eucla, Western Australia

A newspaper man Edmund Stirling proposed a scheme to connect Perth with Fremantle a distance of 19 kilometres (12 mi). After negotiations with the Government they finally agreed to a shared investment. Construction commenced on 9 February 1869 and was opened for service on 21 June 1869. Of great significance to the colony was the connection from Perth to Albany. Many steamer ships from England to the eastern states would call at Albany for supplies on their way to Adelaide, Melbourne and Sydney. If messages, information and newspapers could be intercepted and transmitted quickly to Perth rather than by the long horse and coach journey, a commercial advantage might be gained by Western Australia. The Albany link was completed in 1870. The last Morse code message in the west was sent between Wyndham and Halls Creek in mid 1963.

The following table indicates the take-up date of the new technology by the colonial state governments.

Opening of the first telegraph line in each state
State	Date
Victoria	3 March 1854
South Australia	November 1855
Tasmania	1857
New South Wales	30 December 1857
Queensland	April 1861
Western Australia	21 June 1869

== Connections to the outside world ==
=== The competition ===
Charles Todd and Samuel McGowan both envisaged telegraph links to England via India, and saw the creation of an inter-colonial network as being preliminary to that ambition. From 1858 the prospect of a cable being laid from Britain to Australia began to generate competition within the Australian colonies for landing rights. As early as 1854 the year that Samuel McGowan installed the first line in Victoria, British entrepreneurs Brett & Carmichael builders of the Channel cable presented proposals to colonial governments to land a cable at Perth, via Ceylon (now Sri Lanka). American and British entrepreneurs alike saw Australia as vital terminal points for their expanding overseas cables. For the next sixteen years speculation and competition was rife between competing colonies. Four routes to Australia were serious contenders:

- Brett's Route: Ceylon (Sri Lanka) to Perth, connecting with another submarine cable at Cocos (Keeling) Island.
- Timor Island to the northern coast of Australia near Cambridge Gulf connecting to an overland line to Adelaide
- Java (Banjoewangi) around the Western Australia coast to Perth
- Gisbourne's Route: Port Essington Queensland to Morton Bay, connecting to a submarine cable from Port Essington to Java, another cable from Java to Singapore, and a proposed overland line from Singapore to Rangoon. In 1869 the Queensland colonial government established a cable across the southern intersect of Cape York peninsula in preparation for this connection.

Queensland pushed hard and had a route explored from Cardwell to Burketown in 1866, a distance of 450 miles. Queensland thought they had the overseas link in the bag with an agreement with the British Australian Telegraph Company to connect their new submarine cable from Java to Port Darwin then overland to Burketown. Desperate for the line to instead be built to Port Augusta then via existing landline to Adelaide the South Australian colonial government successfully outmanoeuvred Queensland in a bid to secure connection to the overseas cable with an offer to finance the cost of a telegraph from Port Augusta to Port Darwin (at that time South Australia administered what was to become the Northern Territory). This relieved the British Australian Telegraph Company of the expense of the overland line to Burketown and it changed its allegiance. At the time, however, the majority of the route of the line had not once been visited by Europeans and presented a huge risk, not least financially, to the South Australian government.

=== The Overland Telegraph ===
John McDouall Stuart had previously been commissioned to explore the remote outback to the northern Australian coast through the desert centre, finally after several attempts the northern coast was reached on 24 July 1862. Despite fears before the expedition that vast inland seas may block a route, and although the route was extreme in environmental terms, a path was possible. A contract was let in 1870 and, following immense physical hardship and considerable logistical challenge the Overland Telegraph (the Port Augusta to Port Darwin telegraph line) was completed on 22 August 1872. To build the line to Darwin 36,000 poles were used to close the nearly 3,000 kilometre gap.

=== Submarine cables to the world ===
- 1872 – Port Darwin: The first connection from Australia to the world by submarine cable was the above-mentioned Java to Port Darwin link. In short time the cable failed and was finally restored to service with connection again to England in October 1872, a four-month break in service. The cable had been initially brought ashore at Darwin in November 1871, with Australia's first international telecommunications message being received on 19 November.
- 1876 – The first Australia to New Zealand telegraph link was opened
- 1889 – The third international link arrived at Broome, Western Australia from Batavia (Jakarta)
- 1891 – Bundaberg (Queensland) linked to Gomen (New Caledonia)
- 1901 – A link via the Cocos-Keeling Islands arrived in Perth in 1901. This was part of the around the globe route known as the 'Red Route' and traversed wholly British controlled territory
- 1902 – A telegraph cable across the Pacific between Canada and Australia (landing at the Southport Cable Hut) via Fiji and Norfolk Island was completed in October 1902

=== East–West Telegraph ===
In 1874 the South and Western Australian legislatures voted the sums necessary for the construction of a Port Augusta (SA) to Albany (WA) line, allowing the colony of Western Australia to connect up to the Overland Telegraph Line and the undersea cables to Indonesia and beyond. The line was known as the East–West Telegraph Line, or just East-West Telegraph.

The Western Australian section of the line commenced in Albany, with a ceremonial activity on 1 January 1875. Work began in earnest in April from Albany through country known to be practically waterless. At this time Western Australia had a population of 25,000 with total revenue from all sources being £135,000 per annum, and from that was to come the estimated £30,000 cost of the line.

South Australia's commitment was also significant; it had to complete the line across the vast Nullarbor Plain. South Australia's parliament voted the funds approved on 4 November 1874, allowing the work to commence. After tenders were invited in February 1875, Walter Thompson was awarded the contract for the sections from Port Augusta to Port Lincoln and from there to Fowlers Bay. The third section, taking the line to Eucla, was undertaken by the Posts and Telegraph Department itself and supervised by R. R. Knuckey. On 12 January 1876 the section from Port Augusta to Port Lincoln was finished, followed by the continuation to Fowlers Bay on 26 September 1876. Fowlers Bay to Eucla link was begun in July 1876 with 38 men and 89 horses, under Knuckey. Supplies were held at Fowlers Bay and all equipment and provisions had to be obtained from here or another base set up at Eucla. The work was finally completed on 15 July 1877, meeting the line being built from the west at Eucla, a location close to the WA/SA border, after some very substantial hardships and logistical challenges had been encountered during construction.

The line became operational on 8 December 1877, spanning the distance of 1,986 mi (3,196 km). The newly built repeater stations on the East-West Line initially included:

- Bremer Bay (1875)
- Esperance (1876)
- Israelite Bay
- Eyre
- Eucla (1877)
- Fowlers Bay (1876)

There were upgrades on the line in the 1890s, which included relocating some of the line further away from the West Australian coastal section. The telegraph operated for 50 years, then, with the introduction of electro-magnetic automatic repeaters and a more easily maintained telegraph line alongside the recently completed transcontinental railway line, the line closed in 1927.

The line is listed as a National Engineering Landmark by Engineers Australia as part of its Engineering Heritage Recognition Program.

== Social impact ==
The social impact of the arrival of the telegraph was enormous. Marine archaeologist Dr Silvano Jung said that it caused "a national revolution that started in Darwin", by reducing the impact of Australia's geographic isolation from the rest of the world.

By far the largest customers were the Government, business and the press. Before the telegraph, news and mail could take three months to reach England; the telegraph reduced this to around seven hours. As the telegraph spread, provincial and city newspapers published sections by-lined "by Electric Telegraph". Until the 1870s, overseas news was telegraphed from Adelaide, being the first port of call with telegraphic connection to the eastern states. This gave Adelaide a strategic and financial boost. Charles Todd commented:

We had only one intercolonial wire and on the arrival of every English mail, there was an exciting amount of rivalry between the different newspapers in Sydney and Melbourne, great efforts being made to secure first possession of the line.

For the business community, the telegraph signalled prosperity and wealth. City and country telegraph offices became the centre of trade where orders were placed, banking transacted, market information exchanged. One important duty of the telegraph system was to keep the time of the nation. Time signals were transmitted to all telegraph stations in each colony at one o'clock each day and weather observations were likewise transmitted back to the state capitals.

Science also benefited. One particular case was the use of the telegraph to determine longitude, when in 1868 Todd, with the help of the Government astronomers in NSW and Victoria, linked up the Observatories with a temporary direct telegraph link. The transit of 15 select stars were observed and recorded on the Melbourne Chronograph via the telegraph from Sydney. With further observations and recordings made near Wentworth, Todd was able to establish the position of the 141st degree of east longitude to give a boundary line of the border between South Australia and Victoria.

Towards the close of the 19th century, Australia had become one of the largest users of the telegraph.

== Federation: peak and decline ==
Following the federation of Australia in 1901, the Postmaster-General's Department was established to take over from the states all postal and telegraphic services and administer them on a national basis. The PMG Department progressively improved telegraphic equipment. In 1905, the use of Wheatstone equipment on the Adelaide and Perth routes improved speed to 220 words per minute. By 1922, the Murray Multiplex System allowed one line to be used for eight transmissions at the speed of 50 words per transmission per minute.

As World War II threatened the Northern Territory in 1942, and Japanese forces moved through Java and Timor, the Allies were afraid that Japan would use the telegraph service to eavesdrop on communications with the rest of the world, so the submarine connection from Darwin to Java was cut.

Telegram usage continued to climb within Australia, peaking at 35 million messages per annum in 1945. Thereafter, the telephone continuously eroded the use of telegrams, both because of the relative price of the two services and network service improvements. Additionally, from 1954, teleprinters handled more and more traffic. In 1959, an automated switching system (TRESS) further enhanced the utility of teleprinters by allowing messages that were centrally directed to be automatically retransmitted to their final destination without the need for a human operator. The last telegraph message sent exclusively by land line was sent in mid-1963, and the final message using a land line for any section of its passage was sent in 1964.

By 1975 telegram usage had halved from its 1945 level. The last morse code message on the eastern seaboard was sent in early 1963. In 1993, Australia Post discontinued its letter-gram service, which consisted of postage delivery "telegrams"; that is, messages typed as a genuine telegram, and delivered in the same manner (although never transmitted over telegraph lines).

== Heritage listing ==
In June 2020, the submarine telegraph line between Port Darwin and Java was heritage-listed under the Heritage Act 2011 (NT), and placed on the Northern Territory Heritage Register. This will serve to protect the cables where they come ashore, lying partly buried at Lameroo Beach in Darwin. The Fergusson River Overland Telegraph Line Pylons and Oppenheimer Telegraph Poles had been declared on 28 January 2012, and the Frew Ponds Overland Telegraph Line Memorial Reserve on 6 September 2006 (under previous heritage legislation).

== See also ==
- Australian Overland Telegraph Line
- Cape York Telegraph Line
- Eyre Telegraph Station
- History of Australia
- History of the Electric Telegraph in Australia by Frank Randell Bradley (1934)
- The Early History of the Telegraph Electrical Society, Melbourne by B. McMahon (1939)
- History of wireless telegraphy and broadcasting in Australia
- Biography of Samuel Walker McGowan
- Biography of William Philip Bechervaise
