= Cracknell =

Cracknell is a surname. Notable people with the surname include:

- Adam Cracknell (born 1985), Canadian professional ice hockey left winger
- Carrie Cracknell (born 1980), British theatre director, artistic director of the Gate Theatre, London
- Charles Cracknell MBE (1915–1997), British classical bassoonist and pedagogue
- Charles Cracknell (civil servant), the Youth Enterprise and Employment manager, Hull City Council, Yorkshire
- Chris Cracknell (rugby union) (born 1984), rugby union player
- David Cracknell, media and reputation management expert and former journalist in the United Kingdom
- Dick Cracknell (footballer), English footballer
- Edward Charles Cracknell (1831–1893), telegraph pioneer in New South Wales
- James Cracknell, OBE (born 1972), British rowing champion and double Olympic gold medalist and adventurer
- Kenneth Cracknell (1935–2022), British specialist in interfaith dialogue and the Christian theology of religions
- Leonard Cracknell (1941–1998), British television, radio, film and theatre actor, mainly during the 1960s and 1970s
- Richard Cracknell (1929–2016), English rugby league footballer of the 1950s
- Ruth Cracknell (1925–2002), Australian theatre and television character actress
- Sarah Cracknell (born 1965), English pop singer who fronts the band Saint Etienne
- Vernon Cracknell (1912–1989), New Zealand politician
