= John Yeates Nelson =

Australian public servant (1850–1932)

John Yeates Nelson (1850 – 29 December 1932) was a senior public servant with the Post and Telegraph Department of New South Wales, Australia and later the Australian Federal Postmaster-General's Department. He was heavily involved in the development of Australia's telegraphy and telephony networks. Nelson is notable for assisting with one of the earliest wireless telegraphy experiments in Australia.

== Professional career ==
On 29 May 1886, Nelson was promoted from 2nd Class Operator to Continental Check Clerk in the Electric Telegraph Department within the General Post Office. His associate Alfred Dircks was concurrently promoted into the position he vacated. On 2 December 1889 he was promoted from Continental Clerk to Inspector of Telegraph Lines and Stations for the Northern District in the General Post Office. Again, on 16 October 1890, he was promoted from Inspector of Telegraph Lines and Stations, to be Electrician at the General Post Office. At the same time his colleague Edward William Bramble, was promoted from Senior Telegraph Operator to be Inspector of Telegraph Lines and Stations, in his stead. Following upon the death of his superior Philip Billingsley Walker, the single role of Chief Electrician and Engineer-in-Chief of Telegraphs was split into two positions on 10 September 1900. Nelson was promoted into the Chief Electrician position and his colleague William Wilson into Manager, Telegraph Branch. Nelson's retirement was gazetted on 4 May 1916.

On 26 May 1899, Nelson was appointed to the committee empowered to carry out examinations in connection with the testing of Post and Telegraph Masters, Operators, and Assistants, in the Postal and Electric Telegraph Department, with view to promotion. His superior Philip Billingsley Walker was also part of the committee.

=== Wireless experiments ===
The announcement of successful wireless telegraphy experiments at the Sydney General Post Office by Philip Billingsley Walker, Watkin Wynne and John Yeates Nelson was very widely reported around Australia and, despite the relatively short distance involved, represented a major step forward for the Colony of New South Wales. The Sydney Daily Telegraph of 11 August 1899 comprehensively reported on the experiments of 10 August as follows:

"WIRELESS TELEGRAPHY. EXHIBITION AT THE GENERAL POST-OFFICE. MORSE SIGNALS ON TAPE. Yesterday, at the top of the General Post-office building, an exhibition of wireless telegraphy was given by Mr. P. B. Walker, chief electrician and engineer-in-chief of the Postal Department. Ten feet copper wires were run from the sending and receiving instruments respectively, at either end of the building, each wire as it branched out into space being bright and slightly curved — in fact, the two wires might be said to point at one another, the Hertzian waves passing through the air, as in Marconi's experiments. When the apparatus had been set in position, the following message was sent to Mr. Watkin Wynne, who was at the receiving end:— "Mr. Walker is glad to announce wireless telegraphy as accomplished." Mr. Walker operated the ordinary Morse key himself, and the arrangements were perfect enough to bring the signals out in ink on a tape. The apparatus used consisted principally of a large 12in. spark induction coil, capable of radiating through space electric waves of very high pressure, and of a receiver, called a "coherer." The entire success of the experiments depends upon the arrangement of the latter, which consists of a small glass tube about 2in. long, into which two small plugs of silver are tightly fitted and separated from one another by about one-thirtieth of an inch. The space between these plugs is filled with a mixture of very fine iron filings of nickel and silver. The action of the electric waves, as radiated by means of the induction coil, causes these filings to cohere, and there-by makes an electric contact between the two silver plugs. The latter were for the purpose of the experiment connected with an ordinary telegraph (Morse) recording apparatus, and during the exhibition responded to every impulse radiated by the transmitter. The latter was, of course, controlled by an ordinary Morse key, the arrangement being that long and short streams of electric waves were sent out just as dots and dashes are used in the ordinary everyday working of land and cable wires, although, of course, the speed of the key has necessarily to be curtailed. All the instruments used were manufactured by the Government electricians under Mr. Walker's direction, Mr. Nelson being entrusted with the operation. Two months were occupied in their construction, and experiments have been going on during the past three weeks. The Postmaster-General recently placed £150 on the Estimates in order to obtain the necessary Marconi instruments. The latter are expected to arrive in the colony in about a month or six weeks, and upon their arrival it is intended to carry out experiments similar to those effected in Europe, and especially with the object of ascertaining whether our atmospheric conditions in any way influence the working of the machines."

Nelson's knowledge of wireless telegraphy was well developed and reflected personal interest as much as professional necessity. In a well crafted article over his signature for Sydney's Daily Telegraph newspaper of 2 January 1901, he neatly summarised developments in the field of wireless telegraphy over the last decade in a manner which still reads well today. The overview provided gives appropriate credit to Marconi's advances while noting advances by other experimenters in the field. This position aligns closely with that of postal officials in Great Britain and Australia, already wary of possible monopolization of the technology by Marconi.

== Military career ==
Throughout his working life, Nelson participated in various capacities in the Auxiliary forces of the Colony of New South Wales and subsequent to Federation, that of the Commonwealth of Australia. On 17 October 1902 he was awarded the "Colonial Auxiliary Forces Officers' Decoration" and at that time he was ranked as Major, Director of Military Telegraphs.

== Personal life ==
Nelson was an accomplished rower in younger days. He was an active member of the Mercantile Rowing Club. He was frequently a committee member of the club. When the Telegraph Department commenced their annual regattas from 1880, Nelson was both an official and rower. From the late 1880s it seems other interests had overtaken rowing.

On 23 June 1913, Nelson had been appointed Commissioner for Declarations under the Statutory Declarations Act 1911. This was a common practice for senior public servants to assist in the performance of their duties. Following his retirement, the appointment was withdrawn on 13 March 1917.

== Late life and legacy ==
Nelson suffered a serious illness in 1911 causing him to take leave for several months. While he gave every appearance of having fully recovered, his health was clearly impaired somewhat. He chose to retire in 1916 after 49 years of public service, rather than the more usual period of 50 years as was the custom at the time. Nelson appears to have led a quiet life in retirement, for there are few newspaper reports of his activities subsequently.

== Artifacts ==
- Museums Victoria Jenvey's Coherer, used for communication with St. George, 1901 Museums Victoria

== Publications ==
- Jenvey, H. W. Practical telegraphy : a guide for the use of officers of the Victorian Post and Telegraph Department. vol. 1 (2nd edition Melbourne, 1891) Trove
