= Joseph Oppenheimer =

German-British inventor (1820–1893)

Joseph Oppenheimer (8 February 1820 – 8 February 1893), was a German-born British merchant and inventor who spent most of his adult life working in the telegraphy industry in Australia and the United Kingdom. He held several key patents, including one for telescoping telegraphic poles.

== Biography ==
Joseph Oppenheimer was born in Braunschweig, Germany on 8 February 1820. Little is known about his childhood or his family.

Oppenheimer arrived in the UK in 1845. Oppenheimer lived in Manchester from the 1840s until his death in 1893. He also spent considerable time in Australia, residing in Melbourne and regularly visiting Adelaide. He never married, and maintained a household of several domestic servants and a housekeeper from the 1860s onward. Oppenheimer quickly found his way to Manchester, where he joins a vibrant and growing German-Jewish community which was focused predominantly on the textile industry, but also early manufacturing and technologies around telegraphy and railway. In England, Oppenheimer's social and business networks include key members of the German and Jewish community in Manchester, and he appears to have been a member of the Manchester Congregation of British Jews—one of the oldest Reform Jewish communities in the UK, ultimately leaving them £200 in his will.

Oppenheimer died in Manchester on his 73rd birthday in 1893. He is buried in the Southern Cemetery in Chorlton-Cum-Hardy. His estate, which was worth more than £27,000, a sizeable amount for 1893, was distributed amongst his nieces and nephews, several friends and charities (including Manchester's Jewish School, the Congregation of British Jews and the Royal Infirmary) and his long-time housekeeper Hannah Sampson.

== Career ==
Oppenheimer worked as a salesman for company formed by extraordinary wealthy James and Leopold Reiss—the Reiss Brothers and Co—from 1845 until at least 1852. James Reiss was one of the signatories to Oppenheimer's naturalisation application. In the 1850s, Oppenheimer was variously an agent for Meyer and Co and Siemens and Halske, as well as in partnership with Siegfried Adolphe Meyer and Hermann Hirsch (1850s Manchester) and John Slater (1850s/1860s, Melbourne). These companies all had various intersections with telegraphy, telegraph equipment and manufacturing. For instance, Hermann Hirsch was a civil engineer, with at least one patent in telegraphy from 1861, and of course Siemens, in its many guises, was at the forefront of telegraphy innovation.

Oppenheimer's relationships with all these entities seems complicated, and partnerships were routinely dissolved. There is at least one mention in the Siemens Archives about a fraught interaction between Oppenheimer and Siemens regarding a tender bid in Australia in 1857.

=== In Australia ===
Whilst Oppenheimer maintained a household in Manchester, he travelled regularly to Australia in the 1850s, 60s and 70s. Oppenheimer's first visit to Australia appears to have taken place in 1853, when he traveled to Melbourne on the P&O line. Initially, Oppenheimer was an agent for Meyers and Co in Melbourne where he tendered for everything from water works and cast iron parts to telegraphy. In Melbourne, Oppenheimer becomes develops a working relationship with Samuel McGowan, who was responsible for the introduction of telegraphy to Australia, and the earliest telegraph systems in the colony of Victoria in 1853/54, and contracted with the colonial offices of Victoria for telegraphy supplies. In 1856, he was a member of the South Australian governor's travelling party in 1856 to participate in an inspection and surveying of the country to determine the route for the proposed Victoria-South Australia telegraph line. In the 1850s, Oppenheimer also developed a close relationship, both personal and professional with Charles Todd, then responsible for the installation of telegraphy systems across South Australia, and later the architect of the Overland Telegraph Line and the colony of South Australia's Post Master General. He counted amongst his close friends, Samuel Deering—the long time Agent for the South Australian colony

In 1858, Oppenheimer is embroiled in a scandal regarding the first attempt to lay an undersea telegraphic cable between the mainland and Tasmania. Acting as Agent for Meyers and Co, he tendered a bid to deliver the undersea cable from Victoria to Tasmania. His bid was successful. However, it generated significant controversy in Tasmania where questions were raised regarding the transparency of the tender process, the nature of the relationship between Oppenheimer and McGowan, and Oppenheimer's status as a foreigner. In less than month, he would vacate the tender and it would go to another bidder.

Todd looked to Oppenheimer for assistance, when he commenced the Port Augusta to Port Darwin -- Overland Telegraph—Line. This telegraph line, which would stretch more than 3200 km (or 2000 miles) required 36,000 poles, kilometers of wire, thousands of insulators, and the latest in battery technologies, and telegraphic equipment. Oppenheimer helped secure insulators and metal poles. Over time, the original blend of wooden and metal poles were upgraded with new poles, following Oppenheimer's patented innovations for metal telescoping poles. The so-called Oppenheimer poles were produced in Manchester and shipped to Australia, throughout the 1880s. Oppenheimer's poles were installed along the length of the Overland Telegraphy line. They were also installed in Queensland.

=== Professional Organisations ===
Oppenheimer was a member of a range of organisations in both Australia and Britain. He was elected a member of the Mechanics Institute in Melbourne. In 1874, he joined the Acclimatisation Society in Brisbane . He gifted the society with 4 terracotta statues representing the seasons. These statues were placed in Brisbane's Bowden Park. Oppenheimer was also a member of the Electrical Engineering Society which 1871 as the Society of Telegraph Engineers.

== Patents ==
Oppenheimer's experiences with telegraphic equipment in Australia lead him to generate several key patents from the late 1860s to the 1880s. Patents were lodged in the UK and Australia.

- Nov 16, 1869. Improvements in fixing and staying telegraph post. United Kingdom #3308
- 1874. Improvements applicable to electric telegraph Instruments. United Kingdom #3041
- June 18, 1875. Apparatus for fixing telegraphy posts. United Kingdom #2240
- March 29, 1878. Improvements applicable for insulators for telegraphic purposes. United Kingdom #1248
- October 19, 1876. Pendulums for time-keepers. United Kingdom #4049
- March 13, 1884. Improvements in Telegraph Posts. United Kingdom #4828 (also lodged in South Australia, Patent 458).
- June 16, 1887. Fixing telegraph posts. United Kingdom #8708

His most significant patents relate to improvements in telegraph poles, including a telescoping pole that made transportation easier, and an anchor that helped secure the tall metal pole in sand locations.

== Oppenheimer Poles ==
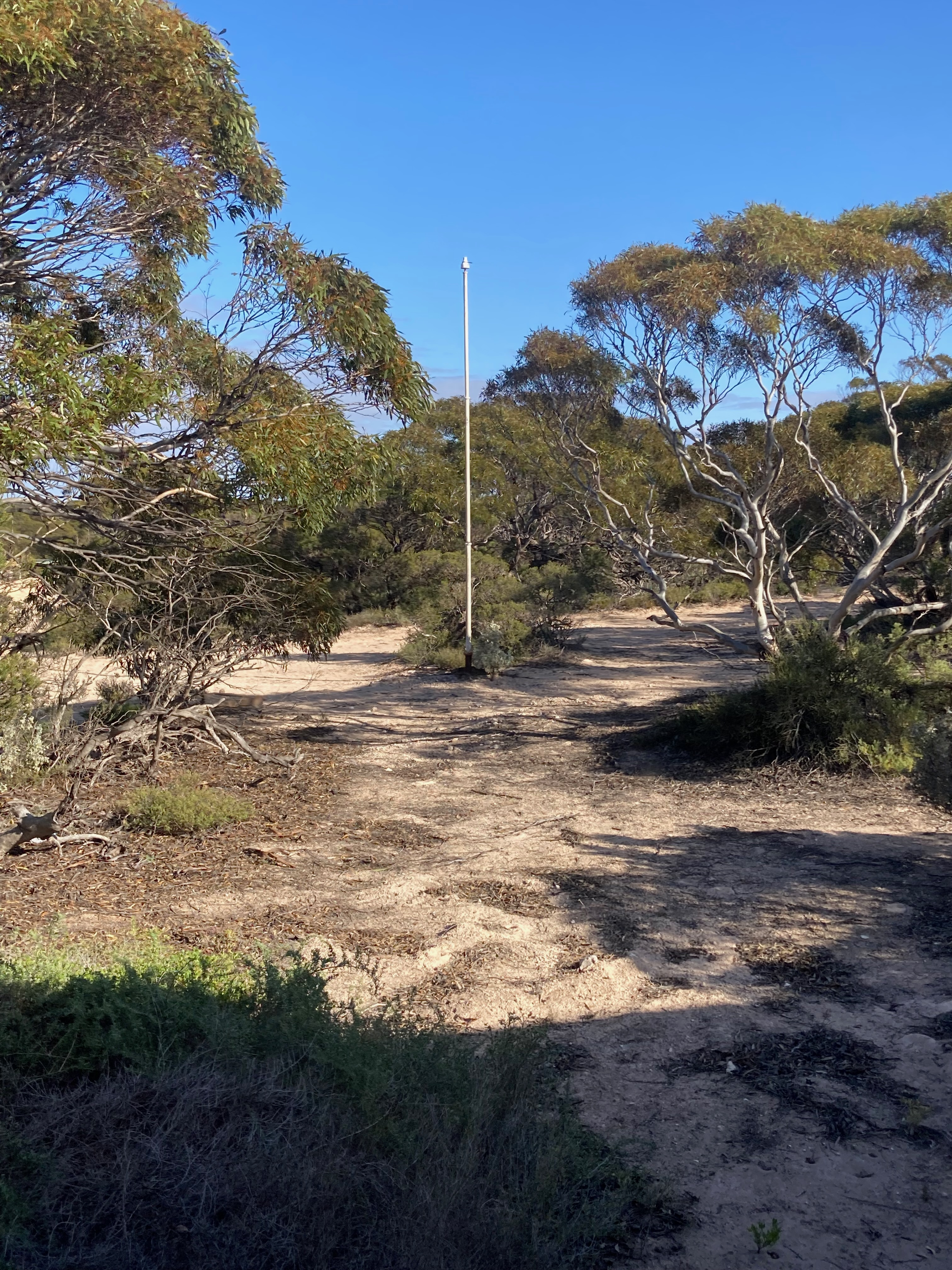
A remnant of the east–west telegraph line between South Australia and Perth, at Eucla, Western Australia.

The Oppenheimer pole was an ingenious innovation, resistant to rot and termites, it was also designed to be easily transported via camel or bullocky train. The Oppenheimer pole could be erected to 3 meters in height, and was available in a lightweight narrow version, or a broader one.

The Oppenheimer poles were designed using three oval shaped galvanised pipes of different diameter and each pipe would slide inside the next. These telescopic poles were ideal for handling and storing and their reduced size made them much easier to transport and erect on site. Once on site they would be extended to their full height and a heated iron collar would then be place over the joint. The iron collar would cool and shrink on the join making it firm. Prior to the poles being installed cast iron base plates were fitted to the bottom of the poles to prevent them from moving.

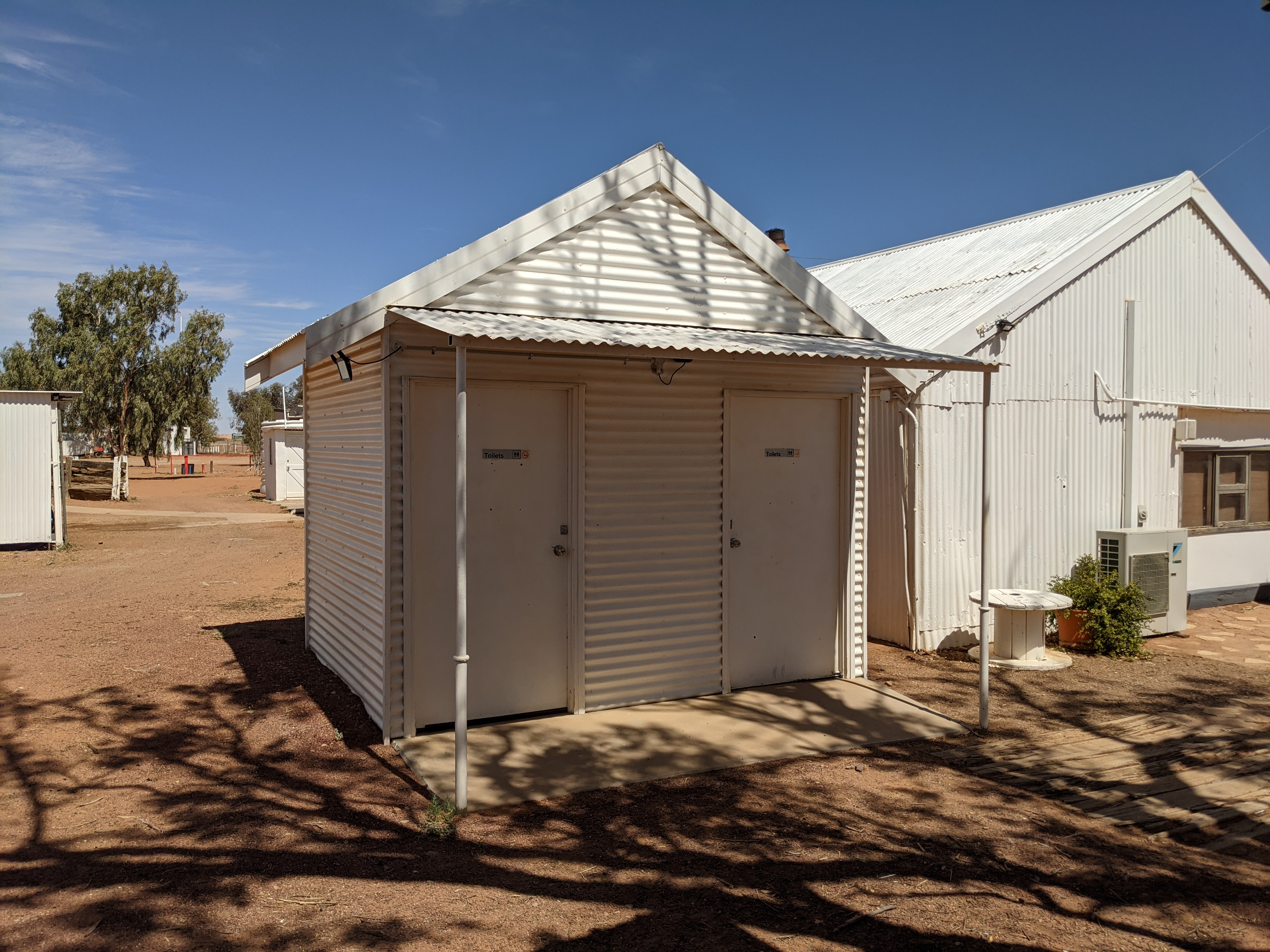
Repurposed Oppenheimer Poles, William Creek Hotel

The largest remaining extant collection of Oppenheimer poles can be found in the Frew Ponds Overland Telegraph Line Memorial Reserve 1085 which was gazetted in June 1962. They are:

... significant to the Territory as a remnant of the original line, and present tangible evidence of the construction methods and materials used in the construction of the 3,000 kilometer line from Port Augusta to Darwin that saw the end of Australia's isolation. The heavy galvanized iron telescopic Oppenheim poles display a style of technology no longer practiced and are a symbol of human ingenuity in solving the problem of transporting large numbers of sturdy termite resistant poles through inhospitable country.

There are 52 (52) poles in Reserve, located along the original telegraph line. Oppenheimer poles can also still be founded in a range of locations along the old Overland Telegraph Line, as well as in Queensland. If you look carefully, you can also find Oppenheimer poles repurposed as flag poles, or in the case of the William Creek Hotel as verandah supports.

A version of the Oppenheimer pole also makes an appearance in Thelma Afford's costume designs for the South Australian 1936 "Pageant of Progress" with her illustration of the Overland Telegraph Line.
