= E. C. Cracknell =

Edward Charles Cracknell (1831 – 14 January 1893) was an electrical engineer, Superintendent of Electric Telegraphs, New South Wales, and Lieutenant-Colonel commanding the Submarine Miners of the New South Wales Militia. He is considered Australia's third telegraph pioneer, after S. W. McGowan of Victoria and Charles Todd in South Australia.

== History ==
Cracknell was born in Rochester, Kent, England, and educated at Oxford. In November 1855 he left for Adelaide in company with (later Sir) Charles Todd, head of the South Australian Post and Telegraph Department, having been selected by Todd as his assistant and future successor. They both came out to South Australia aboard the Irene, and promptly set about installing the line from Adelaide to Port Adelaide and The Semaphore, replacing a less permanent privately operated line financed and constructed by James MacGeorge. Around the end of 1857, he was appointed assistant to Ben Hay Martindale ("Captain Martindale"), Superintendent of Telegraphs in New South Wales, and on 26 January 1858 opened the telegraph line from Sydney to Liverpool, a distance of 22 mi (35 km). This was the third line opened by the Telegraphic Department, the first being between Sydney and Parramatta, and the second Sydney with South Head. Cracknell succeeded Captain Martindale as Superintendent in 1861, with P. B. Walker as assistant. In 1880 he represented New South Wales at the Berlin Postal Conference. He was a strong advocate for the illumination of Sydney by electric light.

=== Military ===
Cracknell was interested in military science, and prominent in promoting the shore defence of Sydney Harbour by means of torpedoes. (Note: Obsolete terminology for submarine mines. See Submarine mines in United States harbor defense for more details and relevance to electric telegraphy.) In April 1874 he was commissioned lieutenant in the Torpedo Corps of the Naval Brigade, which in 1877 became the Submarine Miners Corps of the NSW Military Forces, and was promoted to the rank of major. On 6 April 1886 he was gazetted lieutenant colonel commanding.

He prepared "torpedo" defences at Port Jackson, Newcastle and Botany Bay.

=== Death ===
Cracknell died after a heart attack, and was accorded a full military funeral before burial at Waverley Cemetery.

P. B. Walker succeeded him, as Engineer-in-Chief of Telegraphs.

== Family ==
Cracknell married Margaret Cunningham in Rochester c. 1853; they had three surviving daughters and one son:

- Ada Sophia Cracknell (27 September 1856 in North Adelaide – ) married Ernest Collingwood Colquhoun on 28 August 1885
- Edward William Cracknell (born 26 November 1858 – 15 December 1931) was architect and engineer remembered for advocating alternative route for South Gippsland railway line.
- Eva Florence Cracknell (29 April 1861 – ) married A. C. F. Webb on 23 November 1892
- Alice Ellen Cracknell (c. 1872 – 13 April 1891)

They had a home "Richmond" on Edgecliffe Road, Sydney

His brother William John Cracknell (died 1 December 1898) was for many years Superintendent of Telegraphs in Queensland.
