= Todd Weather Folios =

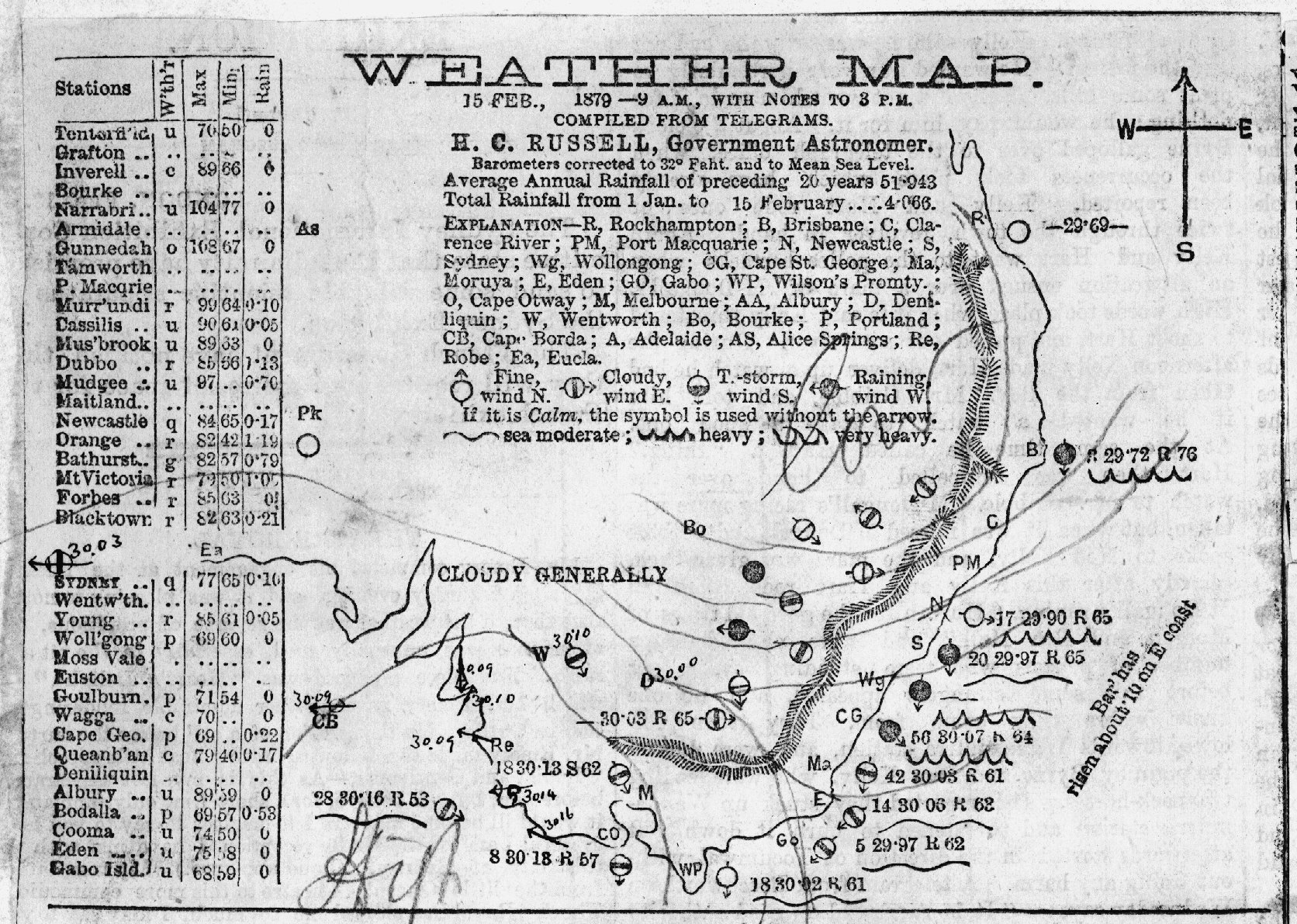
One of the earliest charts in the folios, using the new system of isobaric lines to denote atmospheric pressure. The lines are drawn in pencil on a newspaper map of south eastern Australia.

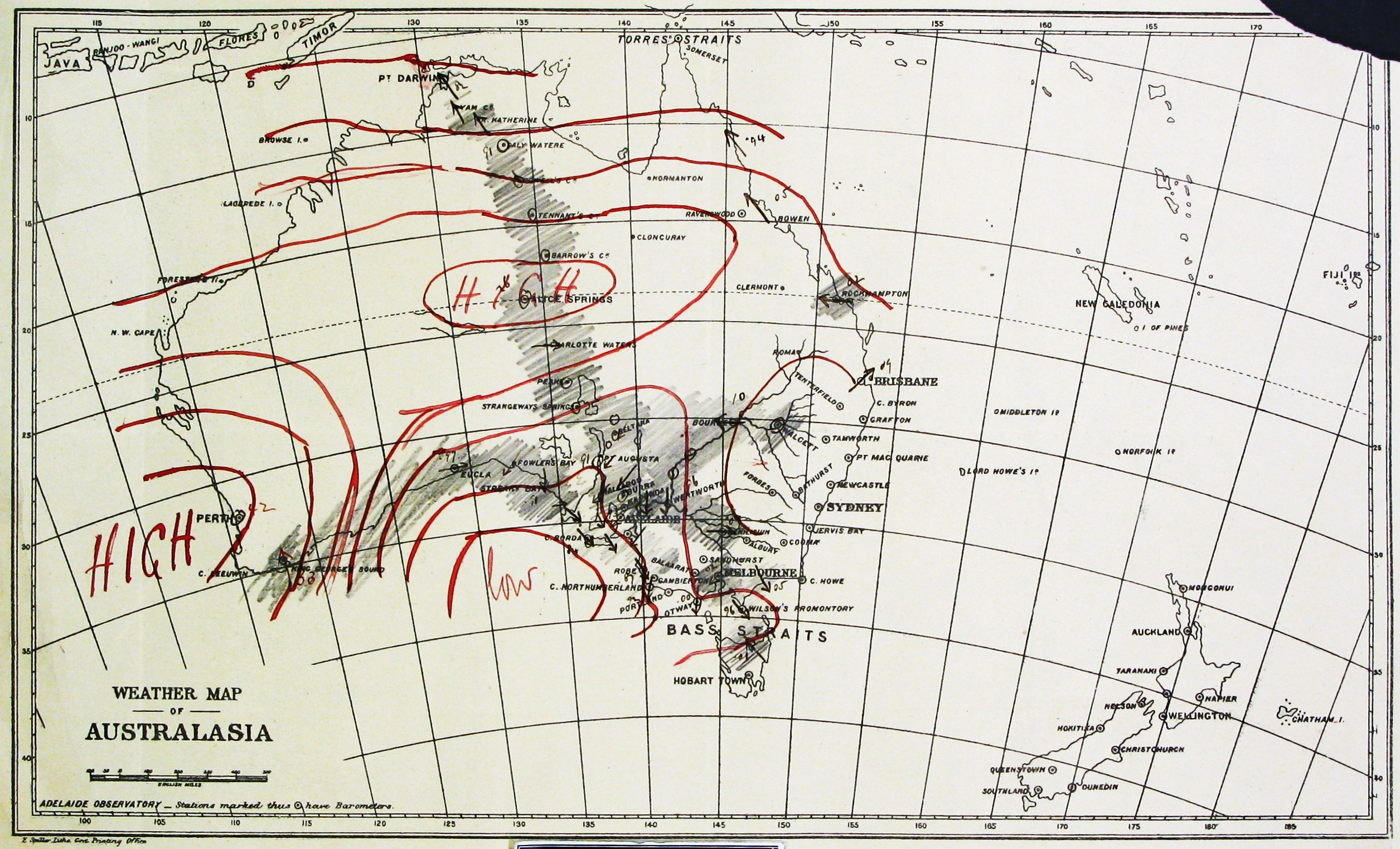
One of the first continental synoptic charts using the data gathered from all colonies (except Queensland). Cloud is represented by pencil shading. Note the shading along the overland telegraph.

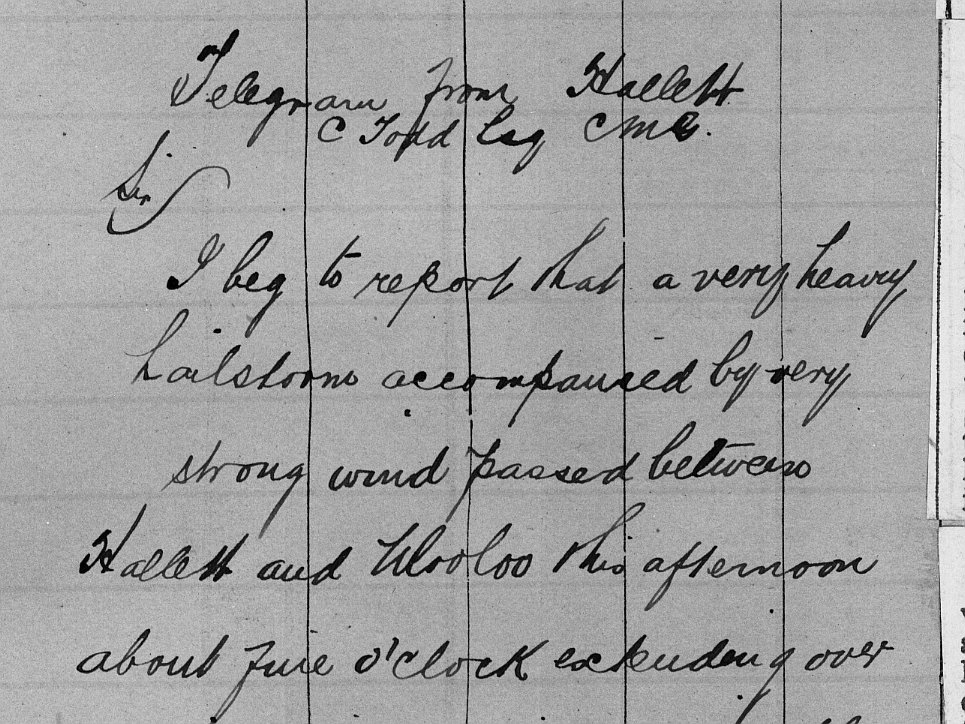
Letter from Mr. F. S. Smith (possibly telegraph operator) of Hallet, South Australia, noting the effects of a recent storm with high winds. Hallet is now one of the centres of wind power generation in the State.

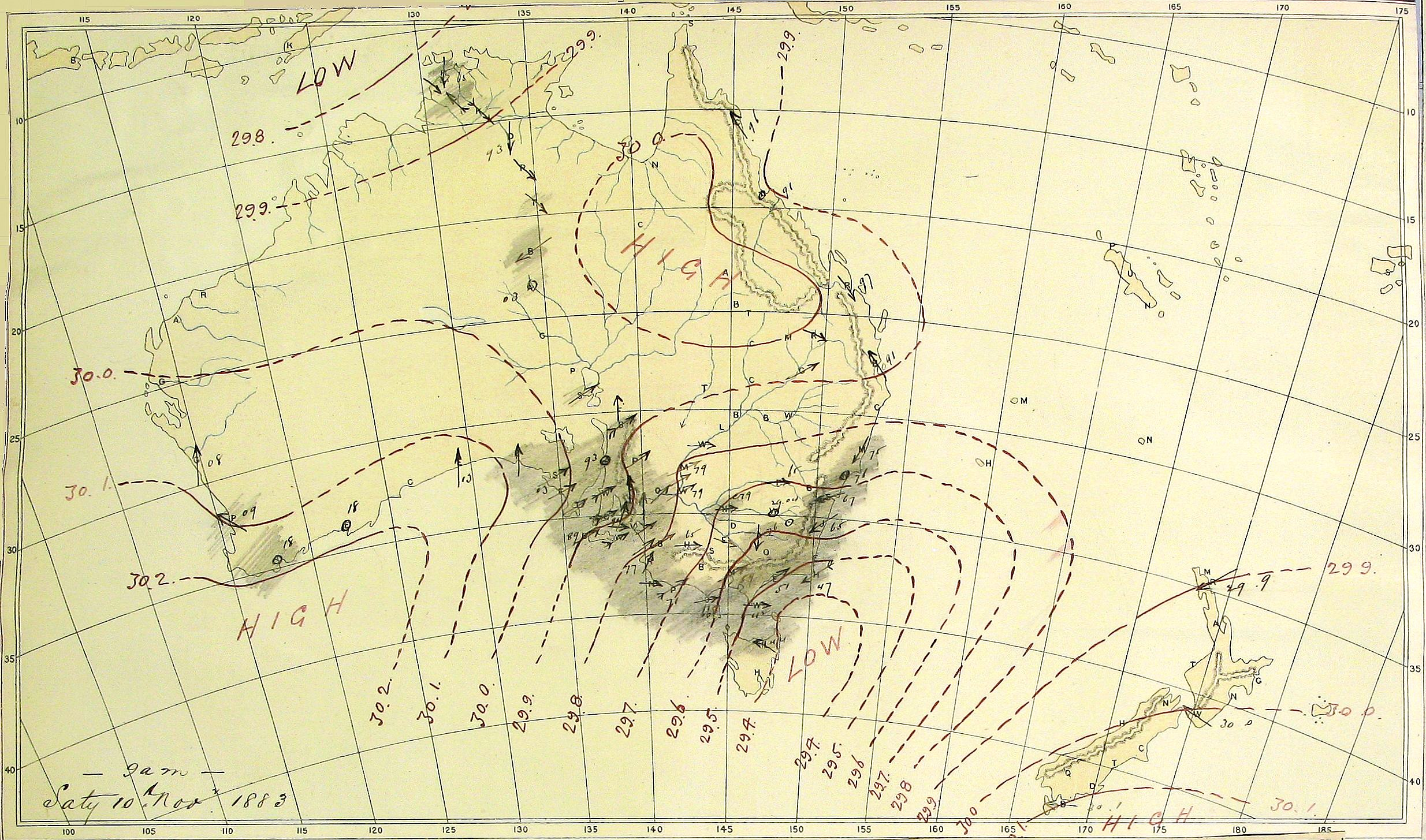
A synoptic chart drawn at the West Terrace Observatory, Adelaide that is larger in geographical reach than any known chart from another meteorological service for that time period.

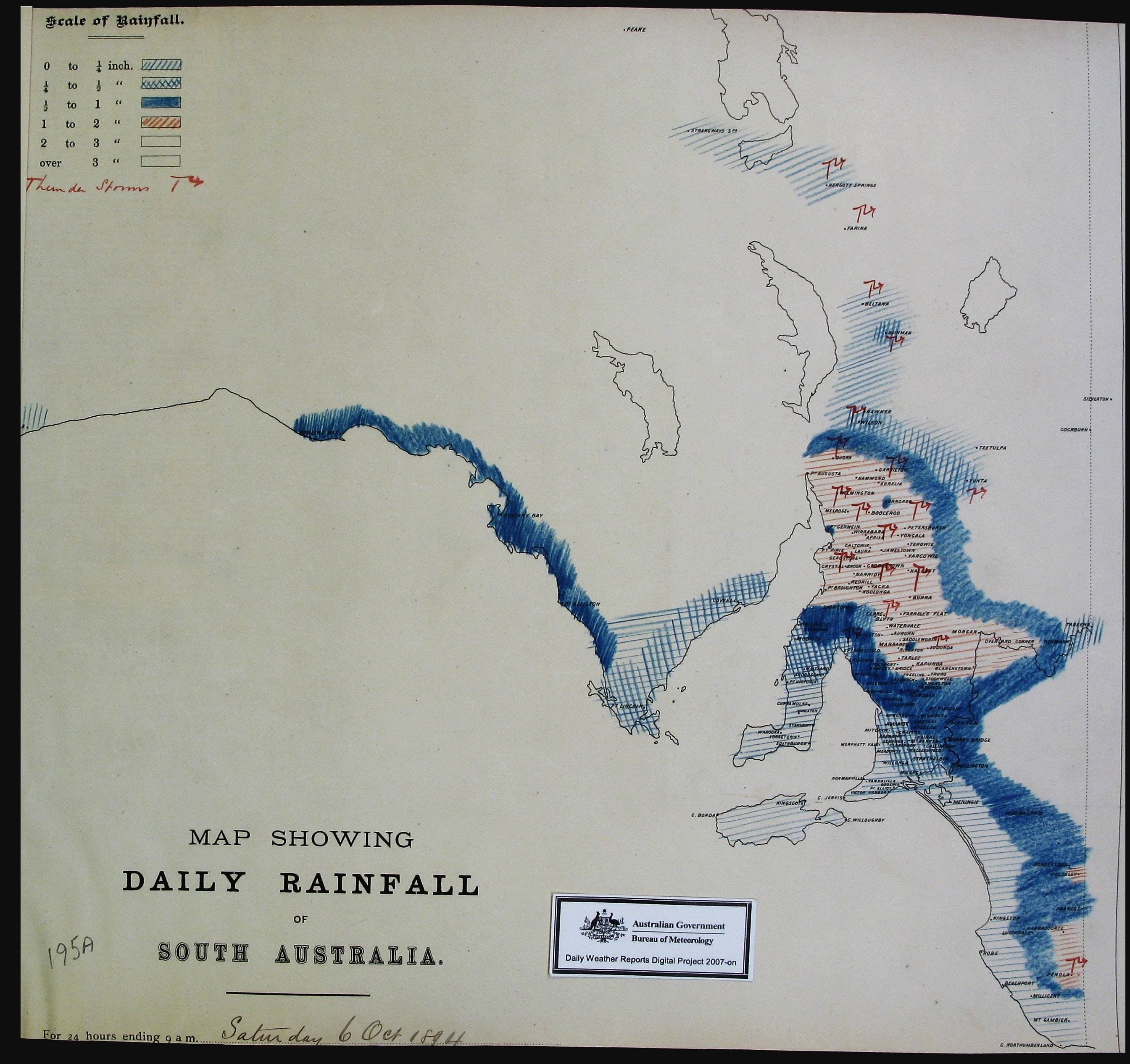
Sample of one of approximately 750 rainfall maps, this also showing thunderstorm activity

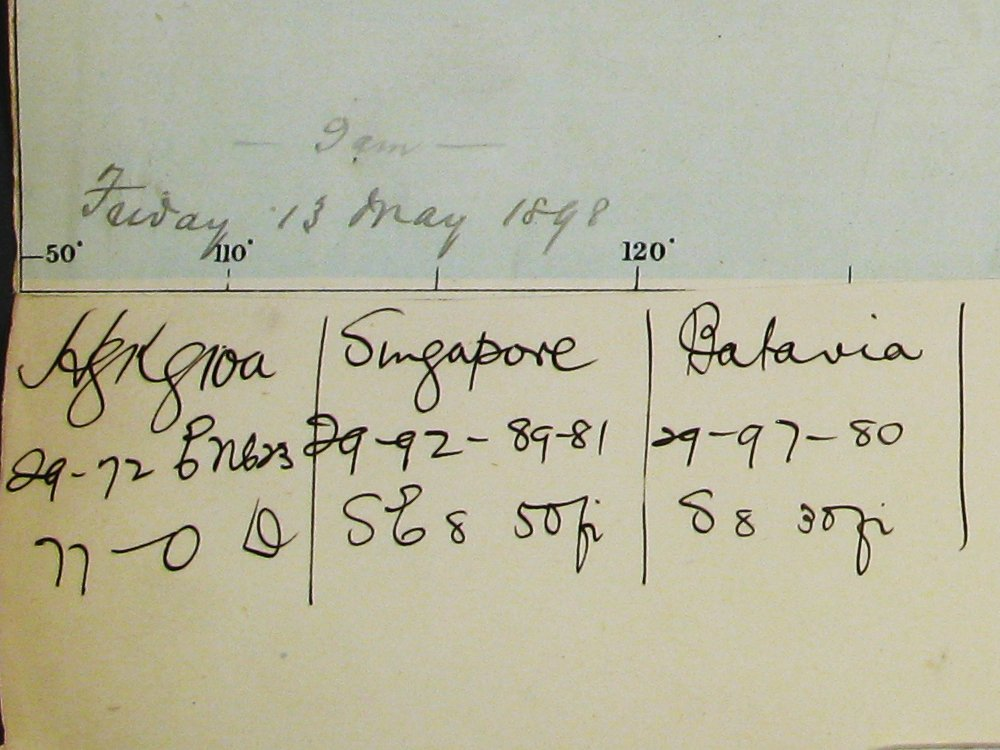
Sample of weather data from overseas telegrams

The Todd Weather Folios are a collection of continental Australian synoptic charts that were published from 1879 to 1909.

The charts were created by Sir Charles Todd's office at the Adelaide Observatory. In addition to the charts, the folios include clippings of newspaper articles and telegraphic and handwritten information about the weather. The area covered is mainly the east and south-east of Australia, with occasional reference to other parts of Australasia and the world. The maps are bound into approximately six-month folios, 63 of which cover the entire period. There are approximately 10,000 continental weather maps along with 750 rainfall maps for South Australia, 10 million printed words of news text, and innumerable handwritten observations and correspondences about the weather.

The folios are an earlier part of the National Archives of Australia listed collection series number D1384.

== The History of the Folios ==
With the advent of the telegraph it was possible to simultaneously collect data, such as surface temperature and sea-level pressure, to draw synoptic weather charts. With Charles Todd's appointment as Postmaster General to the Colony, he trained not only his telegraph operators, but also his postmasters as weather observers. These observers provided valuable data points that, in combination with telegraphed observations from the other colonies (including New Zealand), showed the development and progress of weather activity across a large part of the Southern Hemisphere. Todd's best known feat was his construction management of the Overland Telegraph from Adelaide to Port Darwin. This line of communication was critical to his capacity to create continent-wide synoptic charts as the telegraphic observations from the Outback enabled the connection of data points on the east coast of Australia with similar data points on the west and southern coasts. These continent-scale isobaric lines allowed Todd and his staff to draw synoptic charts that in the early 1880s had a greater breadth than any (known) synoptic charts drawn elsewhere in the world.

The folios grew out of Todd's desire to inform the colonists of South Australia of the immense size of weather systems and that in southern Australia, they generally progressed from west to east and not from east to west as commonly assumed by the early colonists. To accomplish this, Todd displayed daily the last 6 synoptic charts for public viewing then bound and stored them in the folios. The Todd weather folios consist not only of synoptic charts, but also include clippings from newspapers detailing weather statistics and events for all the eastern colonies of Australia. Newspapers from Brisbane, Sydney and Melbourne were collected as they came off the inter-colonial trains and were processed for pasting up next to the corresponding synoptic chart.

The collection from 1879 includes the earliest use of isobaric maps. It then develops through to the first maps posted for public consumption in the mid 1880s, and finishes with the ‘production maps’ of pre-Federalised weather observations and forecasting. The maps are accompanied by other information including the first in-house forecasts (and later published forecasts), early rainfall maps, weather observations from the logs of sailing ships, and telegrams and letters about significant weather events.

== Digitising the Collection ==
As the original documents are in a fragile state and not easily accessible, a team of volunteers of the Australian Meteorological Society (AMETA) hosted by the Australian Bureau of Meteorology, has digitally imaged the full 31-year run of Todd's charts and accompanying text. The digital images have been handed to the National Archives of Australia for inclusion in the Australian Digital Heritage collection. Access to the 26,000 high quality images is also available on-line.

The volunteer group has also digitised data from the Todd folios which have been forwarded for inclusion in the International Surface Pressure Databank (ISPD). This has been done as part of Project ACRE(Atmospheric Circulation Reconstructions over the Earth) of the Climate Monitoring and Attribution Group, Meteorology Office Hadley Centre, UK. ACRE exists to gather data to fuel a weather ‘backcasting’ model extending back to 1750. The Todd folios contain data of value to this initiative, data that is no longer available through other records. In many cases, the original documents containing the data recorded by weather observers are no longer in existence or are irretrievably lost, which gives significance to their recording in Todd's synoptic charts and ancillary documents.

Three key concerns have driven the project; they are to make this historical archive discoverable, accessible, and future-proofed. In an electronic format on the internet, discoverability and accessibility are greatly enhanced. With the National Archives agreement to store the images, future-proofing the electronic images is assured.
