= Oppenheimer pole =

Galvanised iron telegraph pole

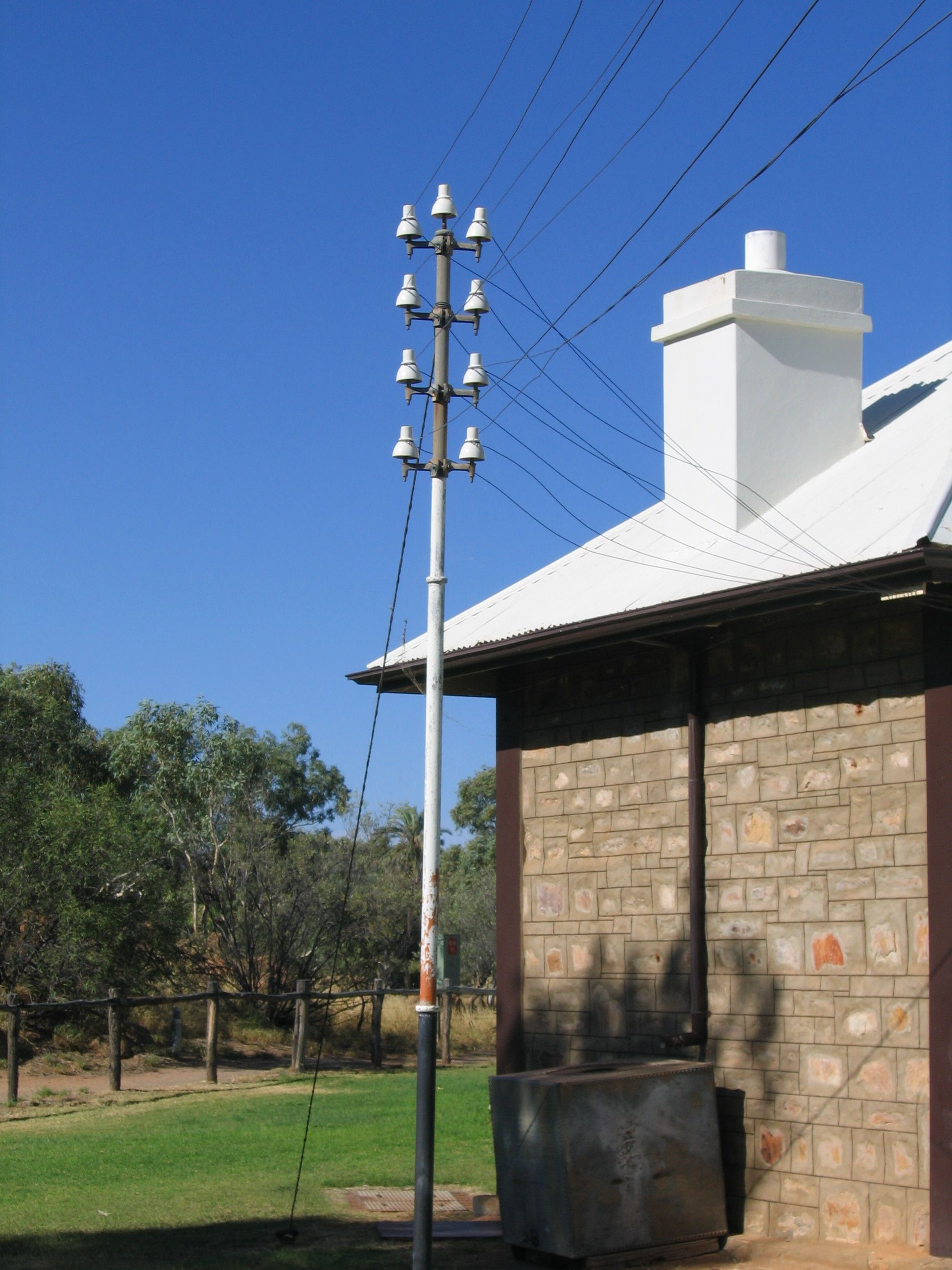
Telegraph lines on an Oppenheimer pole outside the historic Alice Springs Telegraph Station on the former Australian Overland Telegraph Line

Oppenheimer poles are galvanised iron telegraph poles. They consist of three oval sections that collapse into each other telescope-style for transportation. Once extended, the joints between the sections are clamped with collars. The pole is fixed to a base for support with a u-bolt.

The poles were used in the construction of the Australian Overland Telegraph Line in 1872, which ran from Darwin in the north to Port Augusta in the south. It was initially intended to use Oppenheimer poles in regions where there was no suitable timber, and for poles that needed replacing in service. When it became clear that wooden poles on the northern part of the line were going to be rapidly destroyed by termites, it was decided to construct the line with 3,000 metal poles. Wooden poles are also vulnerable to fire and much of the line's route suffers frequent bushfires. Many poles were later replaced with Oppenheimer poles for this reason.

The initial order for 6,000 poles may have been made in Germany by Oppenheimer and Company (it is not certain) but later production took place in England under licence. Many of these poles were carried overland into the Australian interior by camel trains imported from Egypt, complete with their Egyptian drivers. See Australian feral camel.

== Inventor: Joseph Oppenheimer ==
Joseph Oppenheimer (8 February 1820 – 8 February 1893), who was born in Braunschweig, Germany and died in Manchester, England, was a merchant and inventor, and naturalised British citizen, who spent most of his adult life working in the telegraphy industry in Australia and the United Kingdom. He held several key patents, including one for telescoping telegraph poles — the Oppenheimer pole.

Whilst Oppenheimer maintained a household in Manchester, he travelled regularly to Australia in the 1850s, 60s and 70s. Oppenheimer's first visit to Australia appears to have taken place in 1853, when he landed in Adelaide aboard the P&O steamer Shanghai from Singapore. Initially, Oppenheimer was an agent for Meyers and Co. in Melbourne, where he tendered for everything from water works and cast iron parts to telegraphy. In Melbourne, Oppenheimer developed a working relationship with Samuel McGowan, who was responsible for the introduction of telegraphy to Australia, and the earliest telegraph systems in the colony of Victoria in 1853/54, and contracted with the colonial offices of Victoria for telegraphy supplies. In 1856, he was a member of the Governor of South Australia's travelling party participating in an inspection and survey of the country to determine the route for the proposed Victoria–South Australia telegraph line. In the 1850s, Oppenheimer developed a close relationship, both personal and professional with Charles Todd, then responsible for the installation of telegraphy systems across South Australia, and later the architect of the Australian Overland Telegraph Line and the colony of South Australia's Post Master General. He counted amongst his close friends Samuel Deering — the long time agent for the South Australian colony.

Todd looked to Oppenheimer for assistance when he commenced the Port Augusta to Port Darwin — Overland Telegraph — line. This line, which would stretch more than 3200 kms (or 2000 miles), required 36,000 poles, huge quantities of wire and insulators, and the latest in battery technologies and telegraphic equipment. Oppenheimer helped supply insulators and metal poles. Over time, the original mix of wooden and metal poles was upgraded with new poles, following Oppenheimer's patented innovations for metal telescoping poles. The so-called Oppenheimer poles were produced in Manchester and shipped to Australia throughout the 1880s and installed along the length of the Overland Telegraph Line. They were also used in Queensland.

== Oppenheimer pole patent ==
The Oppenheimer pole was not affected by rot or termites, and could be transported easily by camels or bullock drays.

The poles comprised three galvanised pipes of oval cross-section and different diameters so that each pipe would slide inside the next. These telescopic poles were ideal for handling and storing and their smaller size compared with other poles made them much easier to transport and erect on site. Once on site they would be extended to their full height and a heated iron collar would then be placed over the joint. The collar would cool and shrink on the join, making it firm. Before a pole was installed, a cast-iron base plate was fitted to the bottom to prevent it from moving.

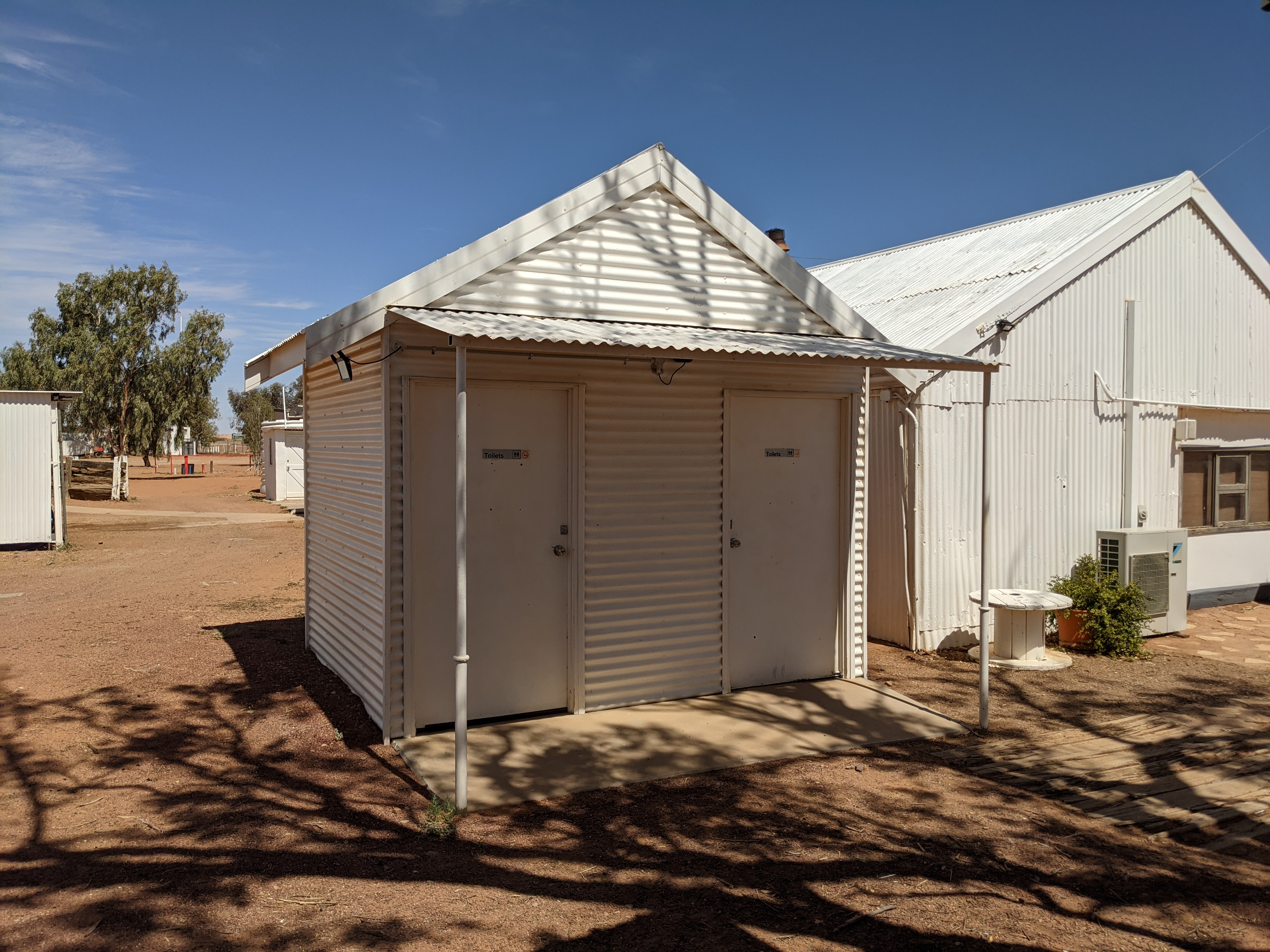
Repurposed Oppenheimer poles, William Creek Hotel, South Australia

Oppenheimer poles can still be found along the route of the former Australian Overland Telegraph Line, and in Queensland and Western Australia. Oppenheimer poles can also be found repurposed as flag poles, or in the case of the William Creek Hotel, as verandah supports. There is also an Oppenheimer pole outside the Daly Waters Pub.

== Frew Ponds Overland Telegraph Line Memorial Reserve ==
The largest remaining extant collection of Oppenheimer poles can be found in the Frew Ponds Overland Telegraph Line Memorial Reserve 1085 which was gazetted in June 1962. They are:

... significant to the [Northern] Territory as a remnant of the original line, and present tangible evidence of the construction methods and materials used in the construction of the 3000-kilometre (1900-mile) line from Port Augusta to Darwin that saw the end of Australia's isolation. The heavy galvanized iron telescopic Oppenheim poles display a style of technology no longer practised and are a symbol of human ingenuity in solving the problem of transporting large numbers of sturdy termite resistant poles through inhospitable country.

There are 52 poles in the reserve, located along the original telegraph line.

== Bibliography ==
- Huurdeman, Anton A., The Worldwide History of Telecommunications, John Wiley & Sons, 2003 ISBN 0471205052.
- McMullen, Ron, "The Overland Telegraph", The Australian Telegraph Office (CD ROM).
- Nomination for Engineering Heritage Recognition: The Overland Telegraph Line 'Joining Point', Frews Pond, Northern Territory, Engineers Australia, June 2012.
