= CLIWOC =

Research project to convert ships' logbook weather data into a computerised database

The Climatological database for the world's oceans (CLIWOC) was a research project to convert ships' logbooks into a computerised database. It was funded by the European Union, and the bulk of the work was done between 2001 and 2003. The database draws on British, Dutch, French and Spanish ships' logbook records for the immediate pre-instrumental period, 1750 to 1850.

== Logbooks in review ==
Logbooks from the eighteenth and early nineteenth century had previously been used in case studies of individual events of historic or climatic interest.

CLIWOC established early ships' logbooks as another source for those seeking to understand climate change, to be used alongside proxy and instrument data. The observations were made at local noon every single day, and cover most of the world's oceans – only the Pacific Ocean lacks detailed coverage. This volume of data was not available by any other means.

== Interpreting the data ==
In researching the data, CLIWOC staff found that the data need to be treated with caution, and subjected to careful scrutiny. The range of information – wind force terms and directions, and general weather descriptions – is consistent between the different national sources. The data was primarily based on observations made by experienced officers.

Though each book used consistent terms to refer to wind speeds, these values were not always consistent between logbooks. The researchers chose to standardise the terms into their Beaufort scale equivalents. The vocabulary used also differed between the national sources – British mariners used a relatively narrow range of terms, while sailors from the Netherlands, Spain, and France used a wider set of descriptions. Researchers found that the majority of wind force entries were accounted for by twelve or so terms, allowing the group to prepare a dictionary defining most wind force terms in use. This multi-lingual dictionary has also been published.

== Data verification ==
In order to establish the reliability of logbook records, the researchers looked at readings taken where ships were in convoy or travelling in close company. These voyages often lasted several weeks, giving large samples. The research showed that there was a consistently high degree of correlation in recorded wind forces and recorded wind directions.

On a number of occasions, the records showed small but persistent differences between absolute wind force records prepared on ships of different sizes. This was adjudged not to materially influence the scientific outcome of the project, but remains a matter for further investigation.

It was also necessary to correct the data to modern norms, both for wind speed and for wind direction – some books recorded data by reference to magnetic north, rather than true north. Precise navigational methods were not widely used until late in the study period, so it was necessary to correct latitude and longitude using specifically designed software.

== The database ==
An initial version of the database was released in late 2003, as a CD-ROM and via the CLIWOC website. The data structure is based on the International Maritime Meteorological Archive (IMMA) format. The data is now available as an Open Office Spreadsheet, a Tab-Delimited Text File, and a Geopackage at the popular website HistoricalClimatology.com.

The database includes information on date and time of each observation, the latitude and longitude of the recording vessel, its country of origin. wind direction and wind force. Where available – usually only towards the end of the survey period – instrumental observations are also included.

== Achieving CLIWOC's objectives ==
After the CLIWOC project ended in 2003, the researchers claimed a number of successes. According to the project's website, these included:

- Established a freely-available database of calibrated climatic data that will be of value in climatic studies;
- Confirmed by objective means the reliability of logbook data;
- Provided a dictionary of terms that allows other scientists to decipher more readily the descriptions contained in logbooks
- Developed a statistical algorithm by which fields of collated logbook data can be used to reconstruct atmospheric pressure fields over the oceans

The CLIWOC database is also being used as an extension of the instrument-based records contained in the I-COADS dataset.

The database was used to feed wind force and direction into statistical models, which in turn produced monthly pressure field reconstructions for the Indian and the South and North Atlantic Oceans. These models provide information for researchers into climate change over the oceans in the century from 1750. It also allows estimates of such measures as the North Atlantic Oscillation and Southern Oscillation indices for this period.

By the time the project closed in 2003, the Spanish logbooks have been almost completely studied. Over 50 per cent of Dutch and over 90 per cent of British and French logbooks remained unexamined – each of these sources contains around 100,000 observations. All sources include many observations taken at times other than local noon; these observations have not been studied in any depth.

== Participants ==
Participating institutions included:

- Universidad Complutense de Madrid
- University of Sunderland
- University of East Anglia
- Royal Netherlands Meteorological Institute
- Instituto de Nivología, Glaciología y Ciencias Ambientales
- National Maritime Museum
- Netherlands Institute for Scientific Information Services
- the US National Oceanic and Atmospheric Administration

== Important publications ==
CLIWOC's efforts culminated in the creation of this historical document, namely A Dictionary of Nautical Meteorological Terms: CLIWOC Multilingual Dictionary of Meteorological Terms; An English/Spanish/French/Dutch Dictionary of Windforce Terms Used by Mariners from 1750 to 1850.

== See also ==
- Atmospheric Circulation Reconstructions over the Earth
- International Comprehensive Ocean-Atmosphere Data Set
- Temperature record
- Temperature record of the past 1000 years
