= Eyre Telegraph Station =

Heritage listed ruin in Western Australia

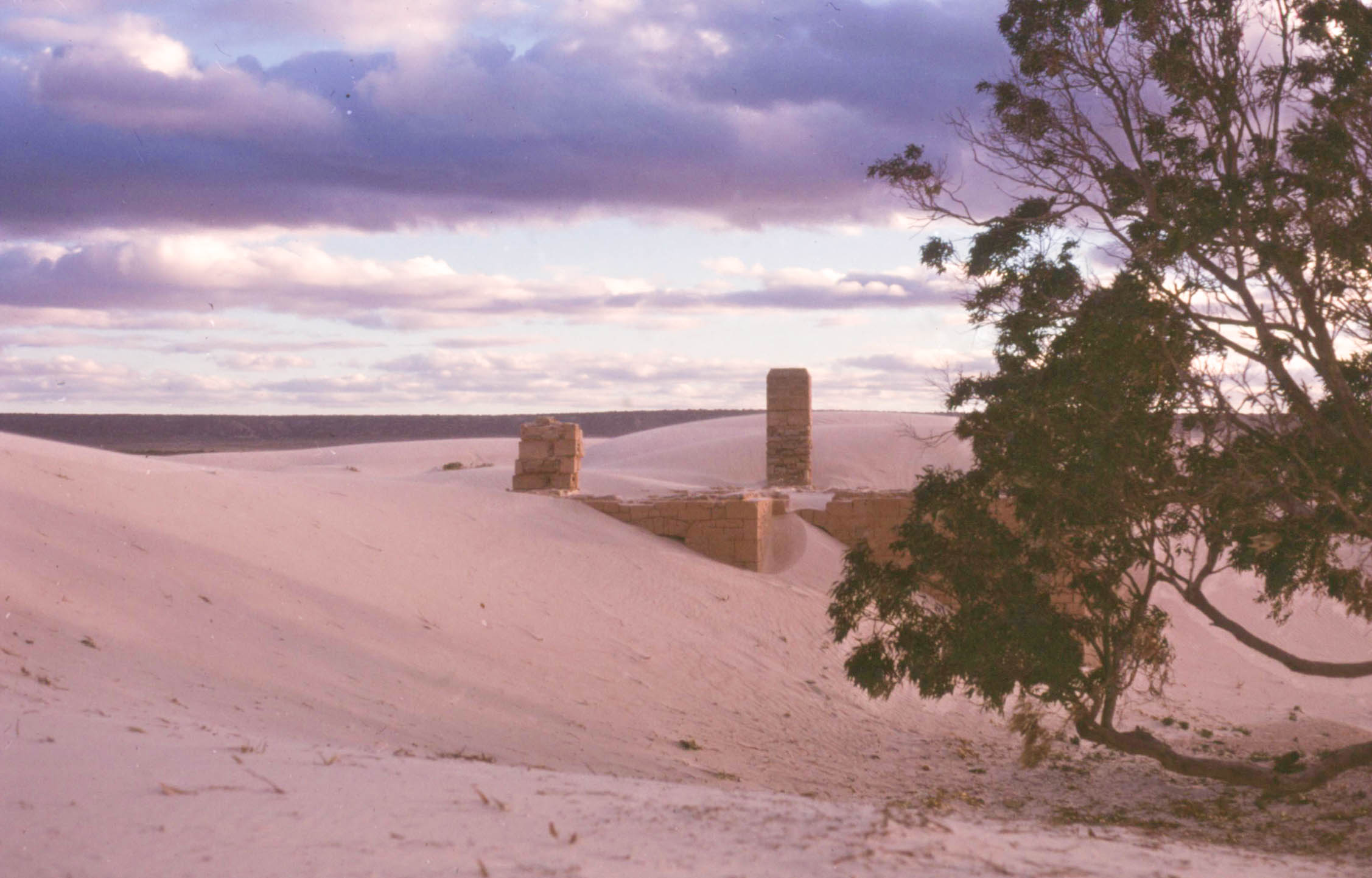
- Eyre Telegraph Station - 1988

- Location within Western Australia

General information
- Type: Heritage listed building
- Location: Great Australian Bight, Western Australia
- Coordinates: 32°14′S 126°18′E

Western Australia Heritage Register
- Official name: Balladonia Telegraph Station
- Type: State Registered Place
- Designated: 19 March 2004
- Reference no.: 761

The Eyre Telegraph Station is a building on the remote south coast of Western Australia, on the Great Australian Bight.

Built in 1897 of local limestone, it is a substantial one-storey structure, with a wide timber-framed verandah and a corrugated iron roof, that housed a telegraph repeater station on the line between Adelaide, South Australia, and Albany, Western Australia.

It is now within the Nuytsland Nature Reserve, below the Nullarbor Plain escarpment, and is surrounded by mallee woodland and sand dunes. The station is 49 kilometres (30 mi) south of Cocklebiddy, close to "Eyre's Sand Patch", the site where explorer Edward John Eyre found water and rested for three weeks in 1841 during his epic 3200 km overland journey along the coast of the Great Australian Bight. The building replaced an earlier and less substantial wooden one built when the telegraph was first constructed in 1875–1877. It would have been staffed by a Telegraph Master with one or more assistants.

After operating for 50 years, the telegraph station was closed in 1927, and the building was left to decay for the next 50. In 1977, it was the focus of a restoration program by the Royal Australasian Ornithologists Union, now BirdLife Australia, with assistance from the Western Australian Department of Fisheries and Wildlife and the Post Office Historical Society, to establish it as the Eyre Bird Observatory, Australia's first. The building is listed on the Australian Register of the National Estate.

== See also ==
- Australian telegraphic history
