= Atmospheric Circulation Reconstructions over the Earth =

The Atmospheric Circulation Reconstructions over the Earth, ACRE, is an international science project, began in 2008, that recovers historical weather observations to reconstruct past global and local weather patterns and so support meteorological reanalysis. The project aims to collect weather data from the past 250 years by linking international meteorological organisations to support data recovery projects and the imaging and digitisation of historical meteorological observations made at, for example, inland stations, lighthouses, or by ships at sea or in ports. The project aims to create historical datasets that are spatially and temporally complete, so as to be of value at a local, or regional level, as well as on a global scale. ACRE aims to recover millions of historic weather observations. This data will be deposited into two databases,

- ISPD - the International Surface Pressure Databank,
- ICOADS - the International Comprehensive Ocean-Atmosphere Data Set.

This data will also be used to build a global dataset of historical weather reconstructions based on a grid of two degrees of latitude by two of longitude at six hourly intervals, entitled the 20th Century Reanalysis, or 20CR. Version one of 20CR, covering 1891 to 2008, was released in Autumn 2009. Version two, covering 1871 to 2010, appeared in December 2011. Version 3, 20CRv3, going back to 1836, was published in October 2019. It is intended that all the data recovered and the 20CR will be made freely available.

== Partners ==
The project has nine core partners,

- The Met Office Hadley Centre,
- NOAA Earth System Research Laboratories,
- Cooperative Institute for Research in Environmental Sciences,
- NOAA National Climatic Data Center,
- International Environmental Data Rescue Organization (IEDRO),
- The British Library,
- The University of Sussex,
- The University of Giessen,
- The University of Bern,
- The University of Southern Queensland.

In addition to the core partners, some 35 projects and other organisations are involved or have contributed recovered data.

== Data sources ==
Sources of historic weather data incorporated into ACRE include,

- Daily and hourly readings from the logbooks of Royal Navy ships, 1912 to 1925, transcribed by volunteers for Old Weather,
- Logbooks of US Navy, USRC and US Coastguard ships in the Arctic and Pacific from the mid-1800s onwards, which are also being transcribed by Old Weather,
- Twice daily readings in the China Coast Meteorological Register, 1874 to 1932,
- Digitised German merchant ship reports, 1872 to 1902, provided by Deutscher Wetterdienst,
- 19th and 20th century data from the Portuguese archives, including material from former Portuguese Asian and African colonies,
- Météo-France archives of historical data for France and for former French colonies.
- Logbooks of the English East India Company from the 1780s to the 1830s,
- British hydrographic and survey vessel remark books from the UK Hydrographic Office.
- Sir Charles Todd's folios of weather observations from across Australia and New Zealand made between 1879 and 1909.

Numerous other sources of historical observations have been identified.

== Outputs and uses ==
The datasets compiled by ACRE will be used to test new climate change models, provide data for climate research, for policy makers and for teaching.

The 20CR dataset has already been utilized in several significant research projects,

- An analysis of global warming based on barometric data,
- A study of the frequency and intensity of wind storms across Europe,
- Studies on the 1930s Dust Bowl,
- Studies of extreme local weather events, such as the Great Blue Norther of November 11, 1911 and the Kansas blizzards of January 1886.
- A reanalysis of the 1922 Knickerbocker Storm

== Important publications ==
CLIWOC's efforts culminated in the creation of this historical document, namely A Dictionary of Nautical Meteorological Terms: CLIWOC Multilingual Dictionary of Meteorological Terms; An English/Spanish/French/Dutch Dictionary of Windforce Terms Used by Mariners from 1750 to 1850.
