= Philip Billingsley Walker =

Australian public servant (1841–1903)

Philip Billingsley Walker (1841 – 5 August 1903) was a senior public servant with the New South Wales Post and Telegraph Department. He was heavily involved in the development of New South Wales' telegraphy and telephony networks. Notable for conducting one of the earliest wireless telegraphy experiments in Australia.

== Early life and family ==
Walker was born at Cheltenham, Gloucestershire, England, 28 February 1840. His father, the Rev. James B. Walker (born 1794), became headmaster of King's School, Parramatta. His mother was Fanny Billingsley (born 1799). They married at Eynsham, Oxfordshire, England on 22 December 1824 and had a large family there, Philip Billingsley Walker being the sixth son. They emigrated to Australia in 1841, arriving at Launceston, Van Diemen's Land on 27 August 1841 on board Arabian. They relocated to Sydney a few years later. The ten children of the marriage were:

- Fanny Hannah Waldo Walker (born 22 December 1825);
- Billingsley Edmonds Walker (born 1827);
- James Charles Walker (born 1829), later of Melbourne;
- Samuel Billingsley (born 1831), later of Queensland;
- Robert Cooper Walker (born 1833), later principal librarian of the Sydney Free Library;
- Llyssye Walker (born 1833);
- Fanny Elizabeth Walker (born 1834);
- Frederick Walker (born 13 June 1837);
- Philip Billingsley Walker (born 28 February 1840); and
- Richard Cornelius Crichett ("Crichett") Walker (born 28 June 1841, on board the Arabian), later Principal Under-Secretary.
- Gertrude Walker was a sister in the Prince Alfred Hospital.

He married Louisa née Mitchell (born 1839) on 26 October 1861. They had six children:

- Isabelle Louisa (born 14 September 1863);
- Alice Victoria Walker (born 1865);
- Eliza Gertrude Walker (born 1867);
- Francis Billingsley ("Frank") Walker (born 4 September 1868), later with the Commercial Bank, Sydney;
- Phillip Stanley Billingsley Walker (born 27 March 1878), predeceased his father; and
- Fanny Rosalie Walker (born 1879);

Phillip Billingsley Walker received his education at the King's School, Parramatta where his father was the headmaster.

== Professional career ==
Shortly after leaving school he entered the public service as a clerk in the Works Department, but shortly afterwards transferred to the Telegraph Office, where he secured a position as operator. He rose rapidly in the service, by dint of sheer merit, and became secretary to the department during Colonel Cracknell's administration, when the telegraphs and post-offices were united under one permanent head. For many years he was assistant superintendent of telegraphs, and in the late 1890s was appointed by the Public Service Board to the position of Engineer-in-Chief to the department, an appointment he held until his death. He was a colonel on the staff, and director of telegraphs, and was in possession of the long-service medal. While con-nected with the Telegraph Department Colonel Walker introduced many needed reforms, and proved himself an efficient and painstaking ad-ministrator. When the Pacific cable agreement was being drawn up he was the officer to whom the Minister looked for advice. The late chief was held in the highest esteem, not only by the officers and employees of the department, but by all branches of the public service, and by a large circle of friends.

=== Wireless experiments ===
On 10 August 1899, the Postmaster-General, one or two officers of the Department and representatives of the press, were invited to a demonstration of wireless under the supervision of P. B. Walker, Engineer-in-Chief of Telegraphs. The transmitting and receiving aerial wires were suspended on the corners of the roof of the Post Office building with the equipment itself in the laboratory below. The demonstration was entirely a success, though interference was present from adjacent tram lines. Walker stated that he felt there was presently limited commercial application, but nevertheless advised that further experiments would be conducted, with sea trials still to be decided upon. The transmitting was undertaken by Walker and the receiving by Watkin Wynne. All the equipment was manufactured by staff of the Government electrician, principally Mr. Nelson. A 12-inch induction coil was used for transmission and a two-inch coherer for reception. An amount of 150 pounds was stated to have been reserved for purchase of equipment from the Marconi Telegraph Company, with further experiments to proceed upon receipt. However Walker fell ill towards the end of 1899 and died in August 1900; with his death wireless telegraphy seems to have fallen dormant for many years.

== Personal life ==
Colonel Walker was a member of the Institute of Civil Engineers, a justice of the peace, an associate of several electrical societies. He was a noted chess player, and was vice-president or the Sydney Chess Club.

== Late life and legacy ==
Walker died of diabetes and pneumonia at Bligh Street, Sydney, on 13 June 1903 and was buried in the Waverley cemetery. His estate was sworn for probate at £4885.

== Artifacts ==
- Museums Victoria Jenvey's Coherer, used for communication with St. George, 1901 Museums Victoria

== Publications ==
- Jenvey, H. W. Practical telegraphy : a guide for the use of officers of the Victorian Post and Telegraph Department. vol. 1 (2nd edition Melbourne, 1891) Trove
