= Charles Todd (engineer) =

Australian civil servant and astronomer (1826–1910)

Sir Charles Todd KCMG FRS FRAS FRMS FIEE
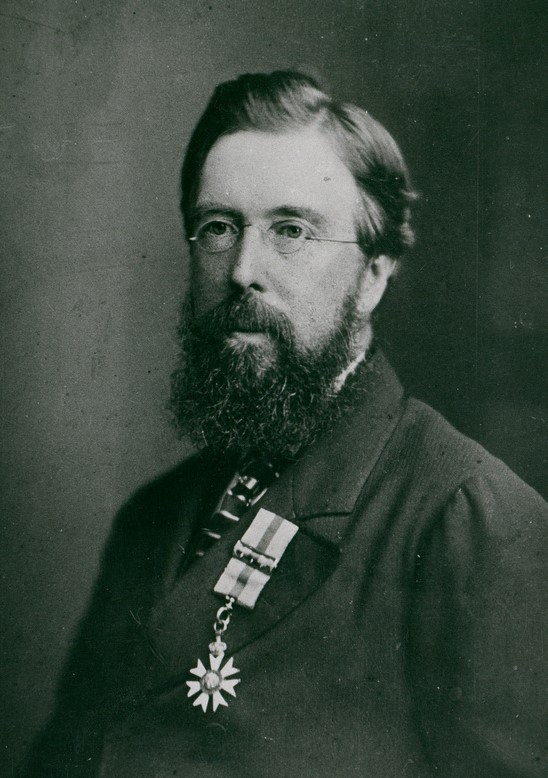
- Born: 7 July 1826; Islington, London, England
- Died: 29 January 1910 (aged 83); Semaphore, South Australia, Australia
- Resting place: North Road Cemetery, Adelaide
- Monuments: The Sir Charles Todd Observatory, the Sir Charles Todd Building
- Education: Greenwich
- Occupations: Astronomical and meteorological observer, and head of the electric telegraph department.
- Notable work: Building the first telegraph line across Australia
- Spouse: Alice Gillam Bell
- Children: Elizabeth, Charles, Hedley, Gwendoline, Maude, Lorna

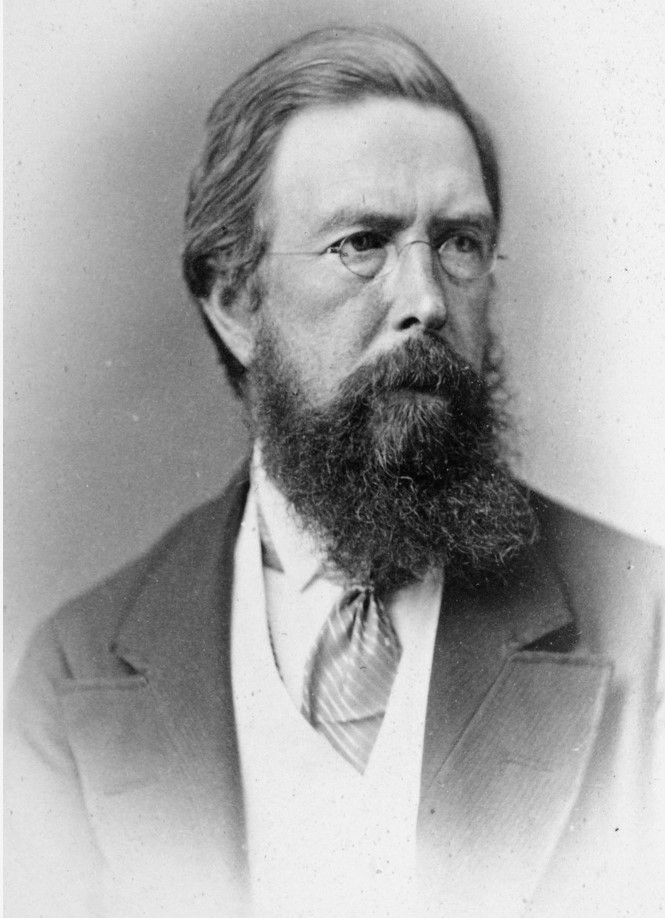

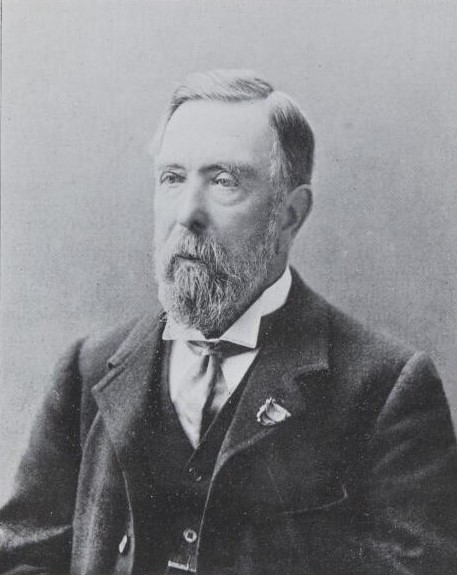

Sir Charles Todd KCMG FRS FRAS FRMS FIEE (7 July 1826 – 29 January 1910) was an Australian civil servant and astronomer who worked at the Royal Greenwich Observatory 1841–1847 and the Cambridge University observatory from 1847 to 1854. He then worked on telegraphy and undersea cables until engaged by the government of South Australia as astronomical and meteorological observer, and head of the electric telegraph department.

== Early life and career ==
Todd was the son of grocer Griffith Todd and Mary Parker; he was born at Islington, London, the second of five children. Shortly after Charles's birth the family moved to Greenwich where he was educated at The John Roan school for boys. His father set up as a wine and tea merchant in Greenwich. Charles was educated and spent most of his life in Greenwich before moving to Australia.

In December 1841, he entered the service of the Royal Observatory, Greenwich, under Sir George Biddell Airy. He was fortunate that his school leaving coincided with the Astronomer Royal being granted special funding to employ an additional four young men as computers to analyse, calibrate and publish a backlog of 80 years of data. While at the Royal Observatory he was, in 1846, one of the earliest observers of the planet Neptune.

He was promoted to Assistant Astronomer at the Cambridge Observatory in November 1847, and officially confirmed in the position the following February. While here he used the recently built Northumberland telescope, and he was the first person to take daguerreotype photographs of the moon through it. While at Cambridge he also gained experience in using the telegraph.

In May 1854 he was placed in charge of the newly-formed Galvanic Department at Greenwich. This was to be an extension of work he had done using the electric telegraph at Cambridge.

In February 1855, he accepted the position of Astronomical and Meteorological Observer, and Head of Electric Telegraph Department in South Australia. Meteorology was work done by astronomers; it was the recording of data so that the climate in different regions was known. The Royal Observatory was run by the Admiralty. Accurate calculation of time was an important part of the Royal Observatory's responsibilities. Greenwich Time had long been used at sea; ship's navigators relied on its accuracy to calculate their longitude.

During Todd's time at the Greenwich and Cambridge observatories the railway system was expanding, and the electric telegraph was invented. Faster railway travel, and the need for timetables and signalling systems, necessitated a change from using solar time in different regions to a standardised railway or London time (later Greenwich Mean Time). The electric telegraph made it possible to transmit information, including time signals, almost instantaneously. So the development of the electric telegraph was driven by the requirements of the railways.

At about the time Charles Todd moved to Cambridge, George Airy arranged the connection of the Greenwich Observatory to the nearby telegraph line that was being built by the South Eastern Railway. This gave the observatories access to the electric telegraph, and the railway company access to accurate time.

Once the electric telegraph was in place, the observatory was able to control clocks and time balls at any place there was telegraphic connection. It was also possible to perform a number of astronomical and other experiments. While at Cambridge, Charles Todd was a member of a team that determined the exact degrees of longitude at Greenwich and Cambridge using the electric telegraph.

Todd's work as head of the Galvanic Department at Greenwich was to be an extension of his work using the electric telegraph. In particular, it was to transmit electric time signals to slave clocks and time balls, and to co-ordinate simultaneous astronomical or meteorological observations at multiple distant locations.

== Arrival in Adelaide ==
Todd, along with his 19-year-old wife Alice Gillam Todd, née Bell, (after whom Alice Springs is named), arrived in Adelaide on 5 November 1855. They were accompanied by Todd's assistant, 24-year-old Edward Cracknell and his wife. (Cracknell subsequently became superintendent of telegraphs in New South Wales). On his arrival Todd found that his department was small. His first commission was to erect a telegraph line between the Adelaide central business district and Port Adelaide. Such a line had been mooted some years before and, impatient with the lack of action and seeing its commercial possibilities, James Macgeorge installed one privately, running his line down council streets since the Government refused him permission to run it along main roads or the railway easement, on the grounds of unnecessary duplication. His line was working on 26 November 1855 and began commercial operation on 10 December.

Todd's line, more direct and technically superior (and far more expensive) was opened in February 1856. To begin, the posts were of uniform size and material — Singapore cedar or Swan River mahogany, 18 feet long or 24 feet where crossing roads, 4 feet into the ground, and uniform appearance — 6 or 7 inches square at the bottom and 5 inches at the top, painted white. Rather than a single wire with earth return, four wires were run, four insulators on each post. Where sandhills had to be crossed, a hardwood crosspiece was bolted to each base so they were impervious to sand drift. A submarine cable was used to cross the Port River, buried in iron pipe where it crossed the shifting sands of the peninsula. Additional equipment included an astronomical observatory in the west Park Lands and a time ball at the Port. The telegraph instruments used were the Henley's magnetic indicator, 1848 patent. In February 1857 Todd's telegraph office was relocated to Green's Exchange, where Macgeorge's instrument had been installed, as a more convenient location.

Later that year, the Government purchased Macgeorge's line and pulled it down.

In June 1856 he recommended that a line between Adelaide and Melbourne should be constructed. Todd and Samuel Walker McGowan, his counterpart in Victoria, proceeded to link the two colonies' telegraph systems near Mount Gambier in July 1858. It was through McGowan, that Todd met Joseph Oppenheimer, a German-born, British businessman and inventor, who would provide assistance to Todd in his future projects, and with whom he would maintain a life-long friendship.

== Overland Telegraph Line ==
In January 1863 Todd addressed the Adelaide Philosophical Society about the possibility of building telegraph routes that would link to an overseas cable.

After the first messages had been exchanged over the new line, Todd was accompanied by surveyor Richard Randall Knuckey on the return journey from Central Mount Stuart to Adelaide, to be met by an enthusiastic crowd.

His next great work was a line from Port Augusta, in South Australia to Eucla in Western Australia – a distance of 759 miles (1,221 km) – in 1876, again surveyed by Knuckey.

In the 1880s, Todd's department replaced the rotting poles along the OTL with Oppenheimer telescoping poles.

== Postmaster General of South Australia ==
In 1870 the Post Office and the Telegraph Department were amalgamated, and Charles Todd was appointed Postmaster General. At this time Todd was busy with the construction of the Overland Telegraph. There were problems with the running of the Post Office culminating in two robberies. Consequently, in 1874 a Government Inquiry was held into the workings of the Post Office. The outcome of the inquiry was positive; Todd was able to implement reforms that improved both the working conditions of Post Office employees and the services provided by them.

He was held in high esteem by his staff.

== Meteorological work ==
Charles Todd was one of the pioneers of meteorology in Australasia. As the Government Meteorological Observer for the Colony of South Australia, he worked with his counterparts in the other British colonies and established the Australia-New Zealand weather observation network. His work in meteorology started with his arrival in South Australia, as he had brought with him a number of meteorological instruments that had been calibrated to instruments at Greenwich.

However, his main contribution to meteorology began with the completion of the Australian and New Zealand telegraph systems in the mid to late 1870s. Being at the centre of the network, Todd used weather observations from all the Colonies to create extensive synoptic charts. In the early 1880s Todd and his staff at the West Terrace Observatory in Adelaide were drawing inter-continental weather charts that had greater geographical reach than any other jurisdiction in the world. Todd's ability to pull together the individual threads of technology, weather science, and a widely dispersed group of weather observers put him in the forefront of the profession. His chief mentor in this field was James Glaisher, one of the founders of the science of meteorology.

Todd is believed to be one of the first meteorologists to suggest that local climate was affected by global phenomena. Todd noted that abnormally high atmospheric pressure in India was matched with similar extremes in Australia, typically resulting in parallel droughts thousands of kilometres apart. This particular phenomenon is now recognised as part of the Southern Oscillation which in turn is part of the El Niño-Southern Oscillation (ENSO). These globally linked meteorological phenomena are termed teleconnections and Todd was one of the first to recognise their effect.

One of Todd's legacies is the 63-volume Weather Folio collection covering the period 1879–1909. These volumes have been digitally imaged by volunteers of the Australian Meteorological Society in conjunction with the South Australian Regional Office of the Australian Bureau of Meteorology. Atmospheric pressure data from these journals has been digitised and sent to the NOAA for inclusion in the International Surface Pressure Databank as part of the ACRE project.

== Government Electrician ==
Charles Todd had many responsibilities, but during his lifetime he referred to himself as "Government Electrician". He promoted the use of electric light in the colony by giving demonstrations of the electric arc lamp, the first in 1860. In 1867 he demonstrated the arc lamp in King William St, lighting up from the Town Hall to North Terrace (about 500m). He was instrumental in having electric lighting installed at the 1887 Adelaide Jubilee International Exhibition, the first in Australia to do so.

Also in 1887, the South Australian Electrical Society was established with Charles Todd as president. He was influential in setting up the first electrical engineering course in SA.

Todd was appointed to a commission to add electric lighting to Parliament House in 1890; he supervised the installation the following year. Two years later the GPO finally had electric light.

In 1899 Todd, with his son-in-law William Henry Bragg, demonstrated a wireless system that could be used over a distance of 4 km; but at this time was too expensive to be put into practice.

Finally, Todd was responsible for drawing up the draft document which would regulate electricity supply in the newly federated Australian states.

== Surveying ==
As "Astronomical Observer" Todd was responsible for accurate setting of the position and the time at the colony, these were part of his initial tasks on his appointment.

The precise position of the Adelaide Observatory was calculated by astronomical observations, enabling a standard point for geodetic surveys to be set.

In 1882 the South Australian Institute of Surveyors was established with Charles Todd as its inaugural president.

From 1886 until his retirement in 1905, Todd set and marked the astronomy paper that formed part of the exams for candidates aiming to become licensed surveyors. His best known work in surveying was his participation in setting the boundary line between South Australia and New South Wales that resulted in a call for a change in the existing boundary between South Australia and Victoria. This call led to a lengthy dispute between the two colonies which was finally settled in Victoria's favour.

== Other achievements ==
The accurate determination of time was achieved by astronomical observations using a transit telescope. The Adelaide Post Office clock was installed in 1875 and it became a key timekeeper for Adelaide.

In his official report to Parliament in 1862 Todd pressed the Government for a time ball to be installed near the port. An accurate signal would be sent by telegraph from the Adelaide Observatory to the port. Time balls were dropped daily at ports so that ship navigators could set their chronometers accurately, a small inaccuracy in a chronometer resulted in large inaccuracies in navigation.

Todd and the Harbour Master made repeated requests for a time ball in the following years. Port Adelaide was visited by more ships after the completion of the Overland Telegraph, and approval by Parliament was eventually given in 1874 to build the time ball at Semaphore. It was completed in 1875, and is believed to have been designed by Todd and manufactured locally.

== Later career ==
In 1885 he attended the international telegraphic conference at Berlin, the following year Todd travelled to Great Britain, where he was made an honorary M.A. of the University of Cambridge. In 1889 he was elected as a Fellow of the Royal Society, London. He was also a fellow of the Royal Astronomical Society, the Royal Meteorological Society and of the Society of Electrical Engineers. Todd continued in his duties to posts and telegraphs in South Australia, until the newly federated Commonwealth of Australia took over all such services on 1 March 1901 and Todd became a federal public servant at the age of 74. He retired in December 1906.

== Death and legacy ==
Todd died at his summer home in Semaphore, near Adelaide, on 29 January 1910, and was buried at North Road Cemetery, Adelaide, on 31 January. The Sir Charles Todd Building at the University of South Australia, Mawson Lakes Campus is named after him. The Astronomical Society of South Australia have also named the observatory that houses their 20-inch Jubilee Telescope, the Sir Charles Todd Observatory. Each year the Telecommunications Society of Australia invites a prominent member of the telecommunications industry to present the Charles Todd Oration and awards a medal to the industry high achiever best embodying the pioneer spirit. He has been inducted into the Hall of Fame of the Institute of Engineers Australia.

The ephemeral Todd River and its tributary, the Charles River, in the Northern Territory were named after Todd, and a waterhole in the bed of the Todd River was named Alice Springs for his wife, Alice, and subsequently used for the telegraph station, and later the town.

== Family ==
Todd married Alice Gillam Bell (7 August 1836 – 9 August 1898) on 5 April 1855. Their children were:

- Charlotte Elizabeth Todd (1856– ) married Henry Charles Squires ( – 12 December 1930) of Clement's Inn, London on 25 May 1887. They lived in Cambridge, England.
- Dr Charles Edward Todd (1858 – 23 May 1917) married Elsie Beatrice Backhouse (sister of Judge Backhouse of Sydney on 1 May 1889 (no children). Honorary Assistant Surgeon at Adelaide Hospital; practised also at the Private Hospital, Wakefield Street in Adelaide; President of the South Australian branch of the British Medical Association 1901–1902.
- Hedley Lawrence Todd (1860 – 4 August 1907) married Jessie Scott ( –1945) on 17 August 1892. Hedley was a member of the Adelaide Stock Exchange.
- (Alice) Maude Mary Todd (1865 – 4 February 1929) married Rev. Frederick G. Masters ( – ) on 1 May 1900. Masters was rector of All Souls' (Anglican) church, St Peter's, Adelaide, then Holy Trinity Church, Balaklava and later vicar of St Luke's, Bath, Somerset, and Dean of Sion College in 1937.
- Gwendoline Todd (1869 – 29 September 1929) married the physicist William Henry Bragg on 1 June 1889. He and their elder son William Lawrence Bragg shared the Nobel Prize in Physics in 1915.
- Lorna Gillam Todd (1877–1963) wrote a series of articles on her father for the Adelaide Chronicle
