= Dick Cracknell (footballer) =

English footballer

Personal information
- Full name: Richard Cracknell
- Date of birth: 1893
- Place of birth: Newcastle upon Tyne, England
- Date of death: unknown
- Position: Half-back

Senior career*
Years	Team	Apps	(Gls)
1914–1915	Newcastle United	0	(0)
1919–1920	Crystal Palace		
1920–1923	Maidstone United		
1923–1926	Crystal Palace	47	(0)
1927	Dartford		
Total		47	(0)
- * Club domestic league appearances and goals

Richard Cracknell (1893–unknown) was an English footballer who played in the Football League for Crystal Palace.
