= Ben Hay Martindale =

Ben Hay Martindale C.B. (1 October 1824 – 26 May 1904) was a British public servant who acted in several managerial positions in the young colony of New South Wales, where he was known as "Captain Martindale".

== History ==
Martindale was born in London, son of Benjamin Martindale, of Martindale, Westmorland. He was educated at Rugby School and the Royal Military Academy, Woolwich, then in 1843 received a commission as second lieutenant with the Royal Engineers at Chatham Dockyard, later at Woolwich. Other postings followed, culminating in 1856 with his appointment as captain under the Inspector-general of Fortifications, London.

Appointed by Governor Denison, on 22 July 1857 he replaced Captain Mann as Chief Commissioner of Railways for New South Wales, there being three Commissioners forming the board of control, then after a change in the Government Railways Act he was, on 28 December 1858, appointed sole Commissioner for Railways at the head of an Executive Council. He was also made Commissioner for Roads, Superintendent of Electric Telegraphs and, briefly, Commissioner for Internal Communications.

One of his first observations was the inconvenient location of the terminal station, and in his first report, dated 22 October 1857, he recommended extending the railway into the city or, at least, construction of a tramway to Circular Quay. He also recommended extending the line into Hyde Park from Redfern, and make that the terminal station.

In January 1861 Martindale resigned and returned to England, and resumed a busy public life. In 1873 he was appointed general manager of the London Dock Company, controlling London Docks and St Katharine Docks, and was later made a director. He was also a director of the City of London Electric Lighting Company. He was made a C.B. in 1871.

He died at his residence, "Weston Lodge", Albury, Surrey, England.

His successors as Commissioner for Railways were John Rae 1861–1878 and Charles Goodchap 1878–1888.

== Personal ==
Martindale married Mary Elizabeth Knocker (died 1902); they had at least two sons.
