= James Macgeorge =

Scottish born South Australian Architect

James Macgeorge (1832 – 9 December 1918) was a Scottish-born architect in South Australia. He is remembered for erecting South Australia's first telegraph line.

== History ==
James Macgeorge was born in Scotland, the fifth son of tailor Robert Forsyth Macgeorge (1795–1860) and his wife Elizabeth M. Macgeorge, née Duncan (1801–), who with their family emigrated to South Australia aboard the Ariadne, arriving on 13 August 1839. They developed the property they named "Urr brae", now the suburb known as Urrbrae.

James was educated at the Church of England Collegiate School (predecessor of St Peter's College), where he was an outstanding pupil. He started practising as an architect in 1855 and in that year responded to a notice in the Gazette of 25 January advertising a contest to design a water reticulation scheme for Adelaide, then petitioned for an enquiry when no prize was awarded. The same year he set about running a telegraph line between the city and Port Adelaide. As early as 1853 the Government had voted money to provide such a line but had made no progress; however when Macgeorge sought planning permission it was refused on the grounds of unnecessary duplication. Macgeorge surmounted these obstacles by avoiding the (government-controlled) railway and main roads, and on 1 December 1855 the line went into service, and performed perfectly. Less than two months later, Charles Todd had, with the greatest expedition, completed the Government line, a more direct, technically superior, and vastly more expensive affair. A year later, the Government purchased Macgeorge's line and pulled it down. Macgeorge's choice of Green's Exchange had proved more convenient to the public than Todd's and was adopted as the government telegraph office.

Between 1853 and 1857 he and brother-in-law John Turner ran a shipping agency, with an office first in Bank Street, then from April 1856, in Currie Street. Following the death of his father in a shipwreck in 1860, James designed and built a house "St Andrews" for himself and his mother, in North Adelaide.

He was a foundation member of the South Australian Society of Arts and its first secretary (1855–1856). Around 1861 he had begun speculating in mining and pastoral property shares and in 1863, following an economic downturn, was forced to declare himself insolvent. His brother Ebenezer, formerly a surveyor in the Public Works Department, joined him in 1864 and as a partnership had a successful architects' practice.

In December 1880 James Macgeorge left Adelaide for England. He died at Ashford, Kent on 9 December 1918.

== Works ==
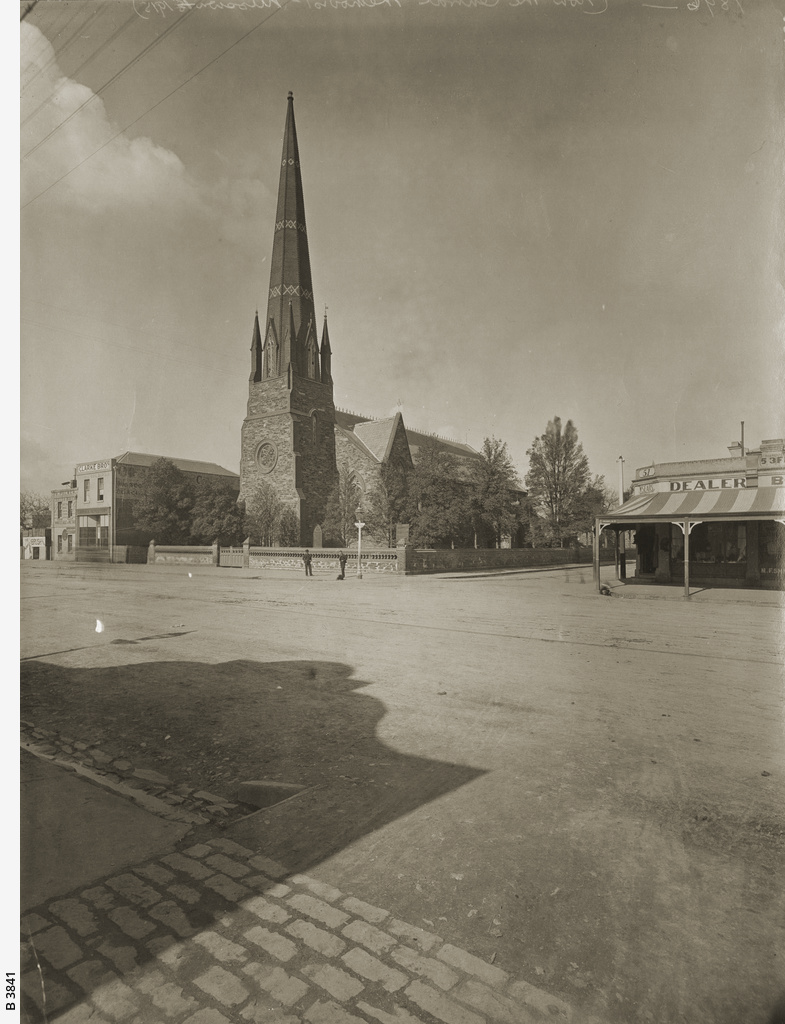
Maughan Church, Adelaide photograph by Ernest Gall, 1896

- Around 1855 he drew up several designs for a grand residence on the Turretfield estate, Rosedale, near Sandy Creek, for pastoralist Richard Holland. He was sacked by Holland in 1861 and Kingston appointed in his place.
- In 1859 Macgeorge won the design competition for the Savings Bank at 18 King William Street, completed in July 1860.
- St Andrews Presbyterian Church, Wakefield Street, Adelaide, completed 1865, was designed by him, perhaps after a competition in 1859. The building stands today, renamed "Willard Hall".
- "St Andrews", the residence between Kingston Terrace (121-125) and Stanley Street (222–230), North Adelaide, which he built for his mother around 1862. It was enlarged by architect E. J. Woods for William and David Murray in the 1870s, and purchased by Charles R. J. Glover in 1914.
- Rebuilding of Cunningham's Bazaar, Rundle Street.
- "Waverley", later "Waverley" at 356-364 South Terrace, Adelaide, built as a residence for pastoralist William Sanders
- He designed the residence "Home Park" for fellow member of the "Free Rifles" W. P. Auld, became "La Pérouse" for Edmond Mazure in 1909, later as "Romalo" was for 90 years the home of the Bonython family, which still stands at 24 Romalo Avenue, Magill.
- Methodist New Connexion Church on Acre 265, Franklin Street, a bluestone church built in 1866 later named Maughan Church for its pioneering minister, James Maughan. noted for its unusual brick spire.
- Congregational Church at Port Adelaide (1867).
- The Congregational Church at McLaren Vale has been attributed to him.
- First section of the Congregational Church on Jetty Road, Glenelg has been attributed to him.
- Macgeorge and his brother designed the Strathalbyn to Port Elliot Railway, opened 1869.
- Macgeorge's design for the University of Adelaide's Mitchell Building won a competition in 1876, but was never used; instead, William McMinn was commissioned to produce a new design.
