= Watkin Wynne =

Watkin Wynne (11 May 1844 – 8 July 1921) was an Australian journalist, local government councillor, local government head and newspaper owner. Wynne was born in Black Notley, Essex, England and died in Waverley, Sydney, New South Wales.

In 1879, he headed a syndicate which started the second Sydney daily newspaper, The Daily Telegraph. This paper under Wynne (the editor) was the first Australian newspaper to use zinc-etching for half-tone illustrations, and linotype machines. The Telegraph's use of an exclusive cable service allowed a world scoop in 1884 when Germany annexed of New Guinea.
