= Samuel McGowan (engineer) =

Australian scientist and administrator (1829–1887)

Samuel Walker McGowan (born 4 January 1829 in Derry, Ireland - died 18 April 1887 Melbourne, Victoria, Australia) was a scientist and public servant who oversaw the creation of the first electrical telegraph line in the Southern Hemisphere. That first telegraph line in Australia ran from Melbourne to Williamstown.

== Legacy ==
In 1872, Mount McGowan was named by Charles Todd after his Victorian counterpart, while surveying the Overland Telegraph Line. After his untimely passing in 1887, his former staff commissioned a stained glass window in his parish church, the Holy Trinity Anglican Church, Balaclava with plaque inscribed "In memory of Samuel Walker McGowan, Deputy Postmaster General of Victoria, one of the vestry of this parish . . . " In 1982, McGowan Place, Dickson, Canberra was named in his memory.

== See also ==
- Postmaster-General's Department
