= Krishna =

Major deity in Hinduism

- God of Protection, Compassion, Tenderness, and Love, Lord of Yogis; The Supreme Being (Krishnaism-Vaishnavism)
- Member of Dashavatara
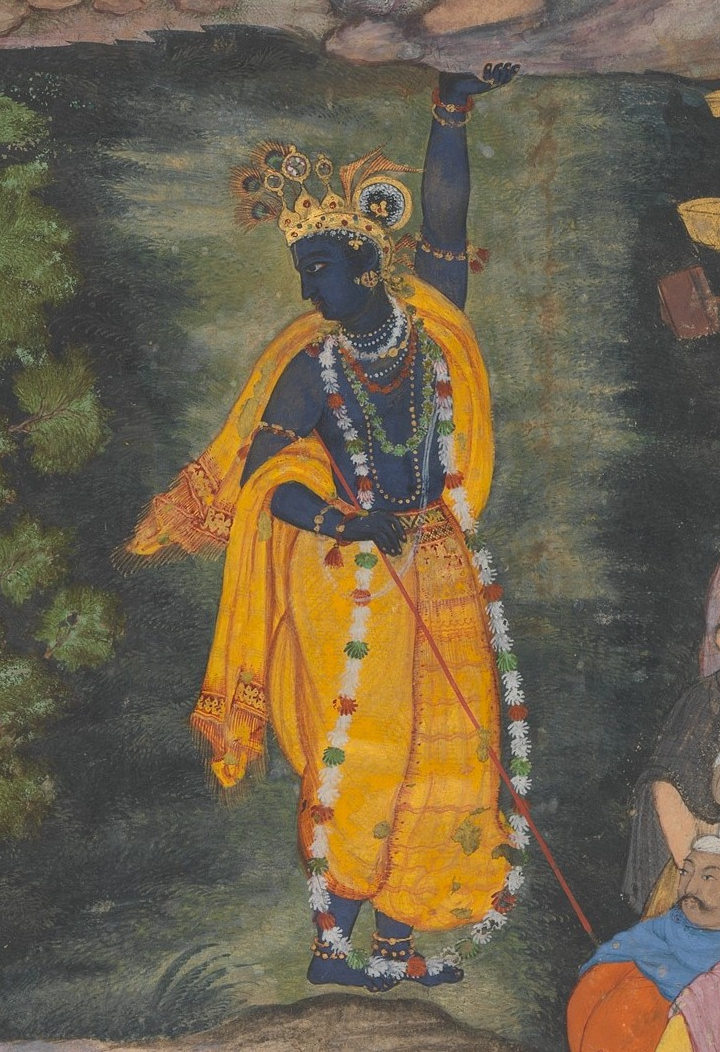
- Krishna lifting Govardhan Hill; folio from the Harivamsa (Mughal painting by Miskin), c. 1590
- Other names: Achyuta, Damodara, Gopala, Gopinath, Govinda, Keshava, Madhava, Radha Ramana, Shyam, Vāsudeva, Krishnan, Kannan
- Devanagari: कृष्ण
- Sanskrit transliteration: Kṛṣṇa
- Affiliation: Svayam Bhagavan (Krishnaism-Vaishnavism); Avatar of Vishnu; Dashavatara; Radha Krishna
- Abode: Goloka; Vrindavan; Gokul; Mathura; Dvaraka; Vaikuntha
- Mantra: हरे कृष्ण Hare Krishna; ॐ नमो भगवते वासुदेवाय Om Namo Bhagavate Vāsudevāya
- Weapon: Sudarshana Chakra; Kaumodaki
- Battles: Kurukshetra War (Mahabharata)
- Day: Wednesday
- Mount: Garuda
- Texts: Mahabharata (incl. Bhagavad Gita); Harivamsa; Bhagavata Purana; Brahma Vaivarta Purana; Vishnu Purana; Garuda Purana; Padma Purana; Garga Samhita; Brahma Samhita
- Gender: Male
- Festivals: Krishna Janmashtami; Gita Mahotsav; Gopashtami; Govardhan Puja; Kartik Purnima; Sharad Purnima; Lathmar Holi; Holi

Genealogy
- Avatar birth: Mathura, Surasena (present-day Uttar Pradesh, India)
- Avatar end: Bhalka, Saurashtra (present-day Veraval, Gujarat, India)
- Parents: Devaki (mother); Vasudeva (father); Yashoda (foster-mother); Nanda (foster-father); Rohini and the other wives of Vasudeva (step-mothers)
- Siblings: Balarama (elder brother); Subhadra (half-sister); other children of Vasudeva
- Consorts: Radha; Rukmini; Satyabhama; Jambavati; other 5 chief queens; 16,000 – 16,100 Junior queens; (Note: Radha is seen as Krishna's lover-consort (although in some beliefs Radha is considered to be Krishna's married consort). On the other hand, Rukmini and others are already married to him. Krishna had eight chief wives, known as Ashtabharyas. Regional texts vary in the identity of Krishna's wives (consorts), some presenting them as Rukmini, some as Radha, all gopis, and some identifying all as different aspects or manifestations of the goddess Lakshmi.)
- Children: Pradyumna; Samba; Charudeshna and other children; (Note: The number of Krishna's children varies from one interpretation to another. According to the Bhagavata Purana, Krishna had 10 sons from each of his 8 chief wives (80 sons) and 1 daughter, Charumati, from Rukmini.)
- Dynasty: Yaduvamsha – Chandravamsha

Dashavatara Sequence
- Predecessor: Rama
- Successor: Buddha/Balarama

Krishna (/ˈkrɪʃnə/; Sanskrit: कृष्ण, lit. 'Black', IAST: Kṛṣṇa Sanskrit: [ˈkr̩ʂɳɐ]) also known as Govinda, Madhava, Gopala, and other names and titles is a major deity in Hinduism. He is worshipped as the eighth avatar of Vishnu and as the Supreme God in his own right. He is widely revered for his divine qualities of love, compassion, protection, and tenderness. Krishna's birthday is celebrated every year by Hindus on Krishna Janmashtami, according to the lunisolar Hindu calendar, which falls in late August or early September of the Gregorian calendar.

Krishna is often depicted in dark skin in accordance with meaning of his name, "black" or "dark". The anecdotes and narratives of Krishna's life are known as Krishna Lila. He is a central figure in the Mahabharata, the Bhagavata Purana, the Brahma Vaivarta Purana, and the Bhagavad Gita, and is mentioned in many Hindu philosophical, theological, and mythological texts. These texts describes him as a divine statesman, teacher, savior of dharma, charioteer, and sometimes a cowherd. They portray him in various perspectives: as a god-child, a prankster, a model lover, a divine hero, and the universal supreme being. His iconography reflects these legends and shows him in different stages of his life, such as an infant eating butter, a young boy playing a flute, a handsome youth with Radha or surrounded by female devotees, or a friendly charioteer giving counsel to Arjuna.

Krishna was born in Mathura to Devaki and Vasudeva, but was raised by Nanda and Yashoda in Gokul to escape his maternal uncle, the tyrant king Kamsa. His life, as given in texts, incorporates highly symbolic miraculous elements: he enchanted the gopis with his divine flute playing, performed the celestial Rasa Lila, and lifted Govardhan Hill to protect his community from devastating rains. He later defeated Kamsa and restored order in Mathura. He went on to establish the city of Dvaraka and played a central role in the Kurukshetra War, serving as Arjuna’s charioteer and delivering the philosophical teachings of the Bhagavad Gita.

The name and synonyms of Krishna have been traced to 1st millennium BCE literature and cults. In some sub-traditions within Hinduism, such as Krishnaism, Krishna is worshipped as the Supreme God and Svayam Bhagavan (God Himself) as he was master in all 64 forms of Art and 14 Vidya. These sub-traditions arose in the context of the medieval-era Bhakti movement. Krishna-related literature has inspired numerous performance arts such as Bharatanatyam, Kathakali, Kuchipudi, Odissi, and Manipuri dance. He is a pan-India god, but is particularly revered in some locations, such as Vrindavan in Uttar Pradesh, Dwarka and Junagadh in Gujarat, the Jagannatha aspect in Odisha, Mayapur in West Bengal, and other places. He is also worshipped in different regional forms across India. (Note: Such as, in the form of Vithoba in Pandharpur, Maharashtra, Shrinathji at Nathdwara in Rajasthan, Udupi Krishna in Karnataka, Parthasarathy in Tamil Nadu, Aranmula and Guruvayoorappan (Guruvayoor) in Kerala.)

Since the 1960s, the worship of Krishna has also spread to the Western world, largely due to the work of the Bhaktivedanta Swami and his organisation, ISKCON.

== Names and epithets ==
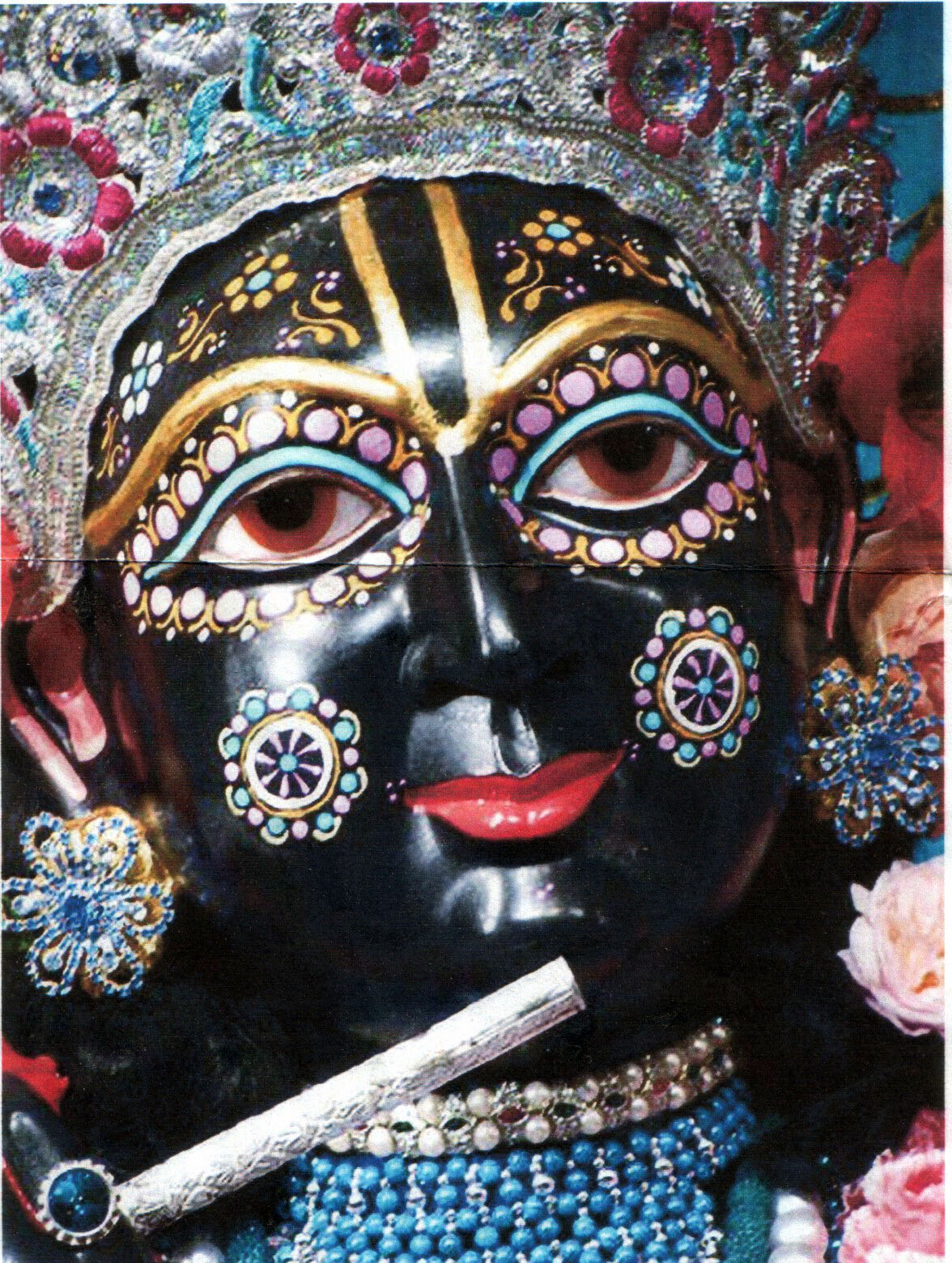
Krishna depicted in dark skin, in accordance with the meaning of the name

The name "Krishna" originates from the Sanskrit word kṛṣṇa, which means "black", "dark" or "dark blue". The term is also associated with the Krishna Paksha, waning phase of the moon carrying its adjective meaning "darkening". In accordance with the meaning of the name, Krishna murtis are often depicted with black or blue skin.

As a name of Vishnu, Krishna it appears as the 57th name in the Vishnu Sahasranama.

Krishna is also known by various other names, epithets, and titles that reflecting his diverse associations and attributes. Among the most common names are:

- Achyuta (Sanskrit: अच्युत): The infallible one; one who never falls from his divine nature
- Ananta (Sanskrit: अनन्त): The endless or infinite one
- Bāl Gopāl (Sanskrit: बाल गोपाल): The child Krishna; protector of cows
- Bānke Bihārī (Sanskrit: बाँके बिहारी): The charming, graceful one who enjoys divine play
- Chakrapāṇi (Sanskrit: चक्रपाणि): One who holds the Sudarshana Chakra (disc or wheel)
- Dāmodara (Sanskrit: दामोदर): One who was tied around the waist with a rope
- Devakīnandana (Sanskrit: देवकीनन्दन): Son of Devaki
- Dvārakādhīśa (Sanskrit: द्वारकाधीश): Lord of Dwarka
- Ghanashyām (Sanskrit: घनश्याम): Dark like a rain-filled cloud
- Giridhārī (Sanskrit: गिरिधारी): Lifter of the (Govardhan) mountain
- Gopāla (Sanskrit: गोपाल): Protector of cows
- Gopīnātha (Sanskrit: गोपीनाथ): Lord of the Gopis
- Govinda (Sanskrit: गोविन्द): One who gives joy to the cows
- Hari (Sanskrit: हरि): The remover of sins and suffering
- Jagannātha (Sanskrit: जगन्नाथ): Lord of the universe
- Janārdana (Sanskrit: जनार्दन): One who protects people; one worshipped by devotees
- Kanhaiyā (Sanskrit: कन्हैया): Beloved young Krishna
- Kānha (Sanskrit: कान्हा): The dark-complexioned beloved one
- Keśava (Sanskrit: केशव): One with beautiful hair; also, slayer of the demon Keshi
- Keev (Sanskrit: कीव): Prankster
- Krishna (Sanskrit: कृष्ण): The dark-complexioned one; the all-attractive one
- Mādhava (Sanskrit: माधव): Consort of Lakshmi; sweet and spring-like one
- Madhusūdana (Sanskrit: मधुसूदन): Slayer of the demon Madhu
- Manmohana (Sanskrit: मनमोहन): One who enchants the mind
- Mohan (Sanskrit: मोहन): The charming or enchanting one
- Murlīdhara (Sanskrit: मुरलीधर): Holder of the flute (Murlī)
- Nandakumāra (Sanskrit: नन्दकुमार): Son of Nanda
- Navanīta Chora (Sanskrit: नवनीत चोर): Stealer of butter
- Parthasārathi (Sanskrit: पार्थसारथि): Charioteer of Arjuna
- Purushottama (Sanskrit: पुरुषोत्तम): The supreme being; highest among all beings
- Rādhāramaṇa (Sanskrit: राधारमण): Beloved of Radha
- Rādhāvallabha (Sanskrit: राधावल्लभ): Dear or beloved of Radha
- Ranchhod (Sanskrit: रणछोड़): One who left the battlefield as part of divine strategy
- Shyām (Sanskrit: श्याम): The dark or dusky one
- Shyāmsundara (Sanskrit: श्यामसुन्दर): The beautiful dark-complexioned one
- Vāsudeva (Sanskrit: वासुदेव): Son of Vasudeva (Sanskrit: वसुदेव) also the indwelling divine presence
- Venugopāla (Sanskrit: वेणुगोपाल): Krishna as the flute-playing cowherd
- Viṣṇu (Sanskrit: विष्णु): The all-pervading one
- Yādava (Sanskrit: यादव): Descendant of the Yadu dynasty
- Yogeśvara (Sanskrit: योगेश्वर): Lord of yoga; master of divine wisdom

Certain names of Krishna also hold regional importance, such as Jagannatha, associated with the Jagannath Temple, Puri, is a popular manifestation of Krishna in Odisha state and nearby regions of eastern India.

In Hindu tradition, Krishna’s names and epithets signify his qualities, relationships, divine functions, and mythological deeds. The Mahābhārata explains names such as Vāsudeva, Viṣṇu, Madhusūdana, Janārdana, and Puruṣottama by linking them to Krishna’s all-pervading nature, lineage, and slaying of demons, while the Bhāgavata Purāṇa connects names such as Dāmodara and Giridhārī to specific episodes in Krishna’s childhood and Vṛndāvana līlās.

== Role and significance in religion ==
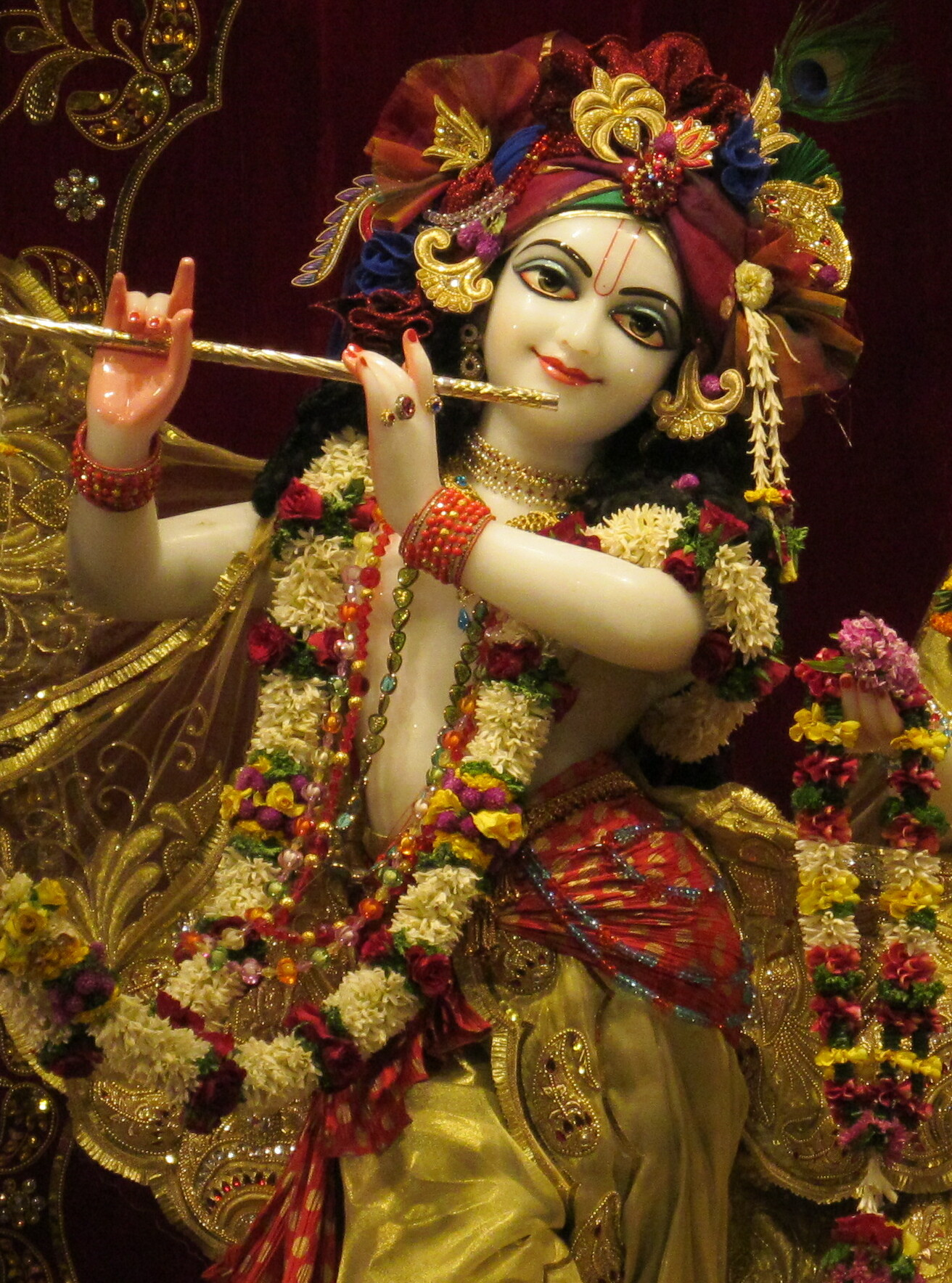
Murti of Krishna at ISKCON, Pune

Krishna is the eighth avatar of Vishnu and a major deity in Hinduism. He is worshipped as a full incarnation of Vishnu and Supreme God in his own right. He is also referred to as Swayam Bhagavan (God Himself) particularly in the Krishnaism and Vaishnavism traditions.

He is the God of protection, compassion, tenderness, and love, and is widely revered among Hindu divinities. He struck down his maternal uncle Kamsa, established the ancient city of Dwarka, and played a pivotal role in the Mahabharata epic by fighting for the Pandavas and concluding the war.

Krishna appears as a central figure in several Hindu texts, including the Mahabharata and the Bhagavata Puran, where he expounds many of his philosophical ideas. The Bhagavad Gita, part of the Mahabharata, is widely read as an independent spiritual text in its own right. It allegorically describes the ethical and moral dilemmas of human life through the conversation of Krishna and Arjuna during the Kurukshetra War. The text presents answers to questions of human freedoms, choices, and responsibilities (dharma) towards oneself and others. These teachings later became a central influence on the Bhakti movement in medieval India.

== Origins and early sources ==
The tradition of Krishna appears to have developed through the amalgamation of several independent deities of ancient India, the earliest attested being Vāsudeva. Vāsudeva was a hero-god of the tribe of the Vrishnis, belonging to the Vrishni heroes, whose worship is attested from the 5th–6th centuries BCE in the writings of Pāṇini, and from the 2nd century BCE in epigraphic evidences such as the Heliodorus pillar. The Vrishnis were thought to have later merged with the tribe of the Yadavas, whose hero-god was Krishna. Vāsudeva and Krishna subsequently merged into a single deity, who appears in the Mahabharata, and started to be identified with Vishnu in the Mahabharata and the Bhagavad Gita. By the 4th century CE, the Gopala-Krishna tradition of the Abhiras centred on the Krishna's role as protector of cattle, which has also been incorporated into the broader Krishna tradition.

=== Early epigraphic sources ===
==== Depiction in coinage (2nd century BCE) ====
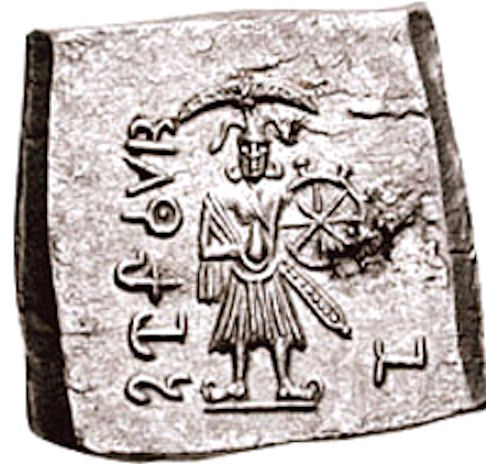
Vāsudeva-Krishna, on a coin of Agathocles of Bactria, c. 180 BCE. This is "the earliest unambiguous image" of the deity.

Around 180 BCE, the Indo-Greek king Agathocles issued coinage (discovered in Ai-Khanoum, Afghanistan) bearing images of deities that are now interpreted as being related to Vaisnava imagery in India. The deities displayed on the coins appear to be Saṃkarṣaṇa-Balarama with attributes of the gada (mace) and the plow, and Vāsudeva-Krishna with attributes of the shankha (conch) and the sudarshana chakra (wheel).

==== Inscriptions ====
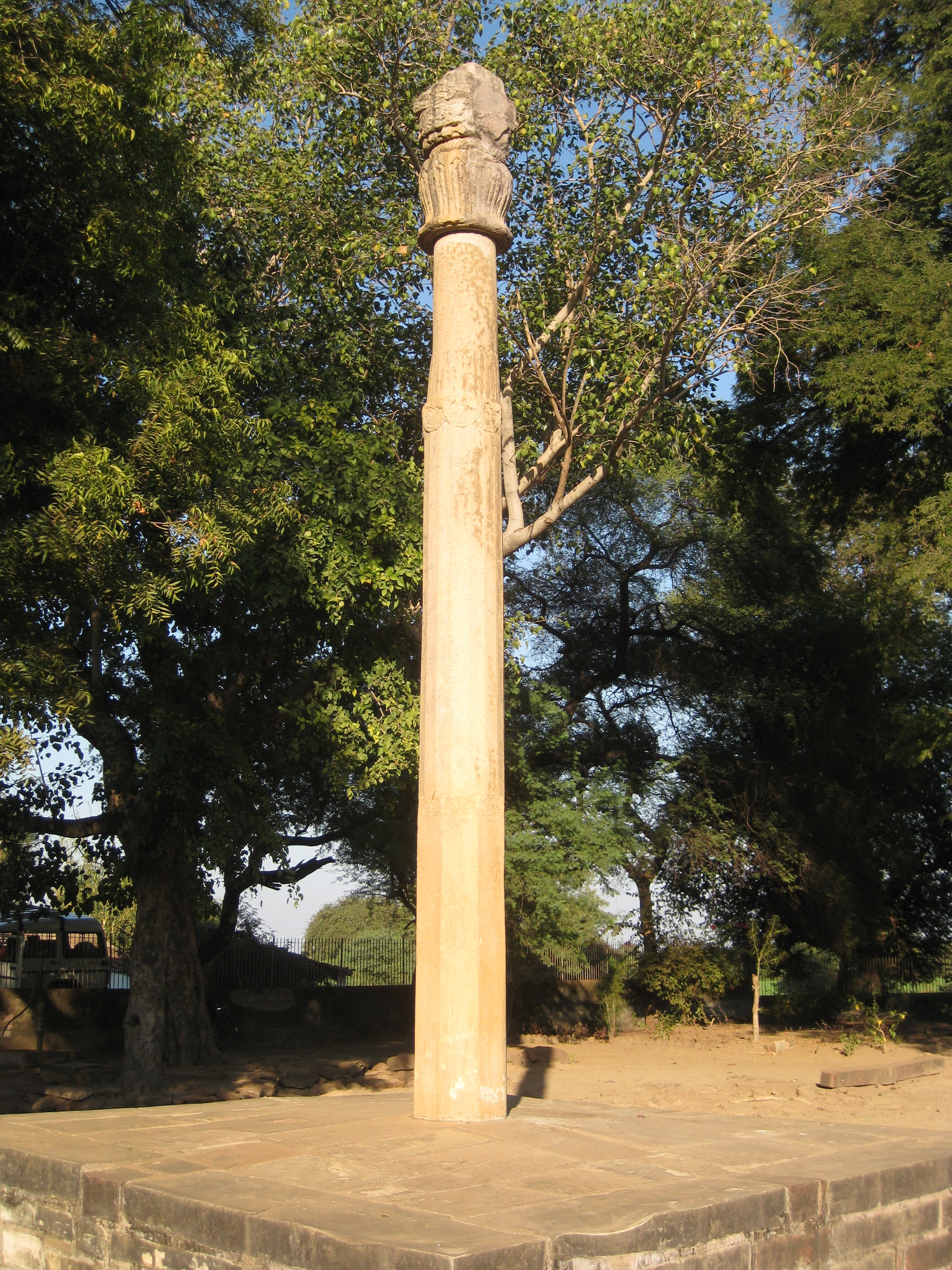
Heliodorus Pillar, Madhya Pradesh, c. 120 BCE; inscription identifies Heliodorus as a Bhagvatena, and paraphrases a Sanskrit verse from the Mahabharata.

The Heliodorus Pillar is a stone pillar with a Brahmi inscription that was discovered by colonial-era archaeologists in Besnagar (Vidisha, in the central Indian state of Madhya Pradesh). Based on the internal evidence of the inscription, it has been dated to between 125 and 100 BCE and is named after Heliodorus, an Indo-Greek who served as an ambassador of the Greek king Antialcidas to a regional Indian king, Kasiputra Bhagabhadra. The Heliodorus pillar inscription is a private religious dedication of Heliodorus to Vāsudeva, an early deity and another name for Krishna in the Indian tradition. The inscription states that the column was constructed by "the Bhagavata Heliodorus" and that it is a "Garuda pillar" (both Vishnu-Krishna-related terms). Additionally, the inscription includes a Krishna-related verse, from chapter 11.7 of the Mahabharata, that states that the path to immortality and heaven is to correctly live a life of three virtues: self-temperance (damah), generosity (cagah or tyaga), and vigilance (apramadah). The Heliodorus pillar site was fully excavated by archaeologists in the 1960s. The effort revealed the brick foundations of a much larger ancient elliptical temple complex with a sanctum, mandapas, and seven additional pillars. The Heliodorus Pillar inscription and the temple are among the earliest known evidence of Krishna-Vasudeva devotion and Vaishnavism in ancient India.

The Heliodorus inscription is not isolated evidence. The Hathibada Ghosundi Inscriptions, all located in the state of Rajasthan and dated by modern methodology to the 1st century BCE, mention Saṃkarṣaṇa and Vāsudeva, and state that the structure was built for their worship in association with the supreme deity Narayana. These four inscriptions are known for being some of the oldest-known Sanskrit inscriptions. However, historians argue that the Hathibada-Ghosundi inscription is associated with Jainism, as it explicitly mentions the Jina.

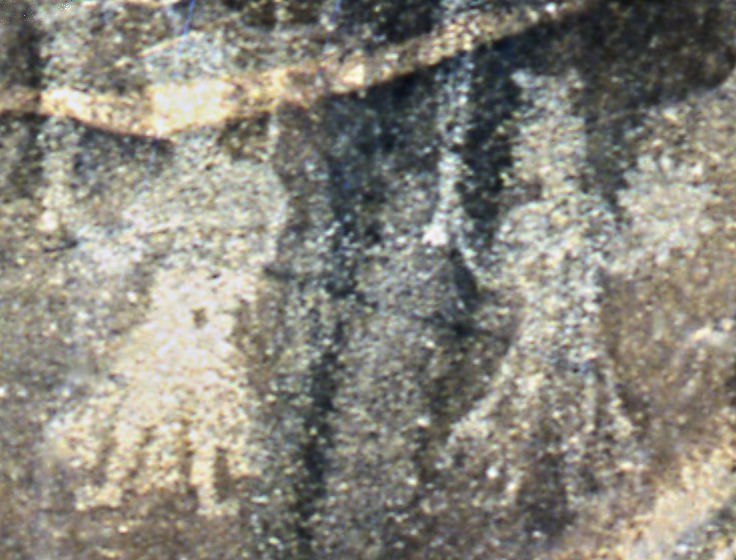
Balarama and Krishna with their attributes at Chilas. The Kharoshthi inscription nearby reads Rama [kri]ṣa. 1st century CE.

A Mora stone slab found at the Mathura-Vrindavan archaeological site in Uttar Pradesh, now held in the Mathura Museum, has a Brahmi inscription. It is dated to the 1st century CE and mentions the five Vrishni heroes, otherwise known as Saṃkarṣaṇa, Vāsudeva, Pradyumna, Aniruddha, and Samba.

The inscriptional record for Vāsudeva starts in the 2nd century BCE with the coinage of Agathocles and the Heliodorus Pillar, but the name of Krishna appears rather later in epigraphy. At the Chilas II archaeological site dated to the first half of the 1st century CE in northwest Pakistan, near the Afghanistan border, two male figures are engraved, along with many Buddhist images nearby. The larger of the two male figures holds a plough and a club in his two hands. The artwork also has a Kharosthi inscription, which has been deciphered by scholars as Rama-Krsna, and interpreted as an ancient depiction of the two brothers, Balarama and Krishna.

The first known depiction of the life of Krishna himself comes relatively late, with a relief found in Mathura dated to the 1st–2nd century CE. This fragment seems to show Vasudeva, Krishna's father, carrying baby Krishna in a basket across the Yamuna. At one end, the relief shows a seven-hooded Naga crossing a river, where a makara crocodile is thrashing around, and, at the other end, a person seemingly holding a basket over his head.

=== Literary sources ===
==== Mahabharata ====
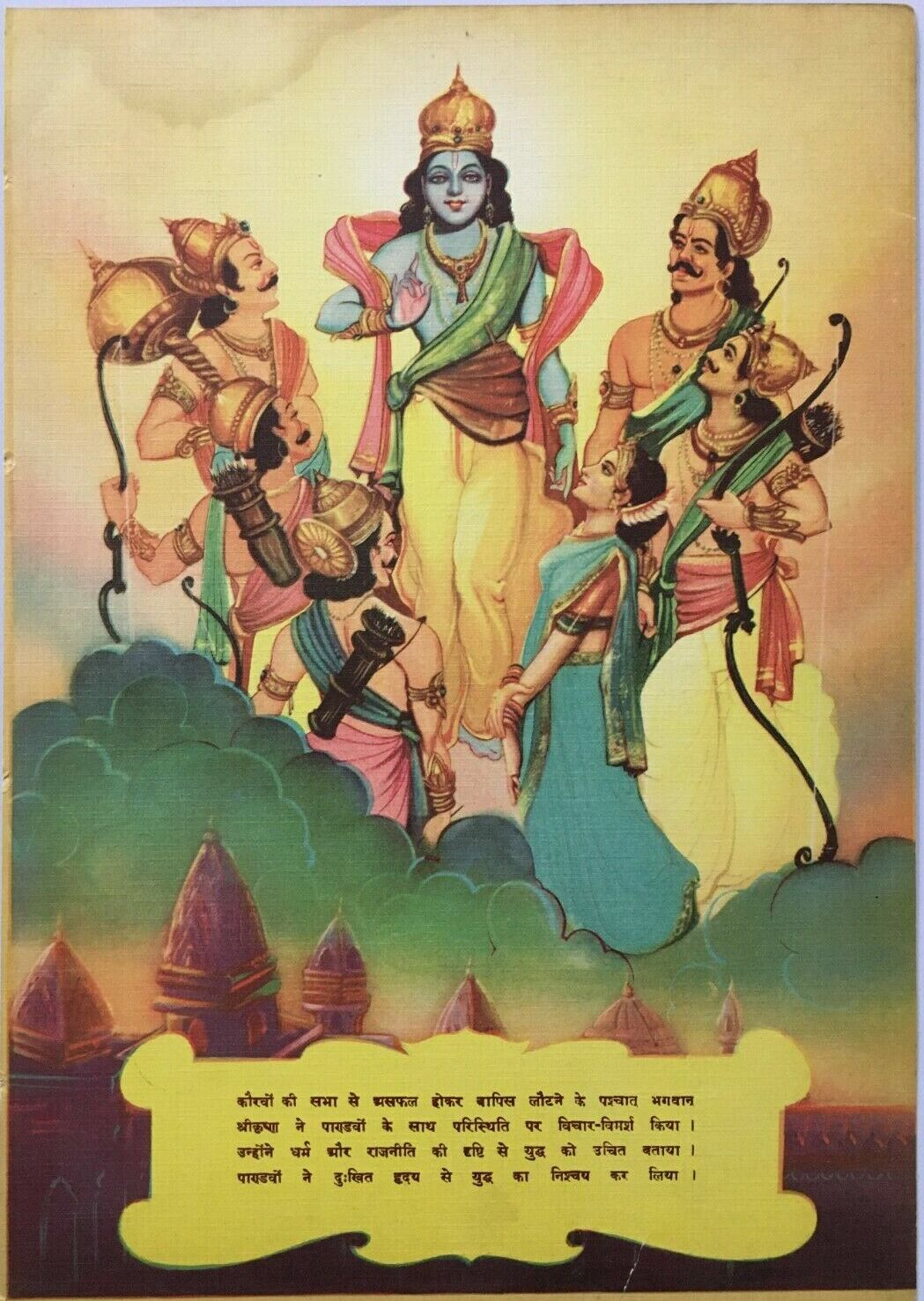
Krishna advising Pandavas

The earliest text to contain detailed descriptions of Krishna as a personality is the epic Mahabharata, which depicts Krishna as an incarnation of Vishnu. Krishna is central to many of the main stories of the epic. The eighteen chapters of the sixth book (Bhishma Parva) of the epic, which constitute the Bhagavad Gita, contain the advice Krishna gives to Arjuna on the battlefield.

At the time the Bhagavad Gita was composed, Krishna was widely seen as an avatar of Vishnu rather than an individual deity, yet he was immensely powerful and almost everything in the universe other than Vishnu was "somehow present in the body of Krishna". Krishna had "no beginning or end", "fill[ed] space", and every god but Vishnu was seen as ultimately him, including Brahma, "storm gods, sun gods, bright gods, light gods, and gods of ritual". Other forces also existed in his body, such as "hordes of varied creatures" that included "celestial serpents". He is also "the essence of humanity".

The Harivamsa, a later appendix to the Mahabharata, contains a detailed version of Krishna's childhood and youth.

==== Other sources ====
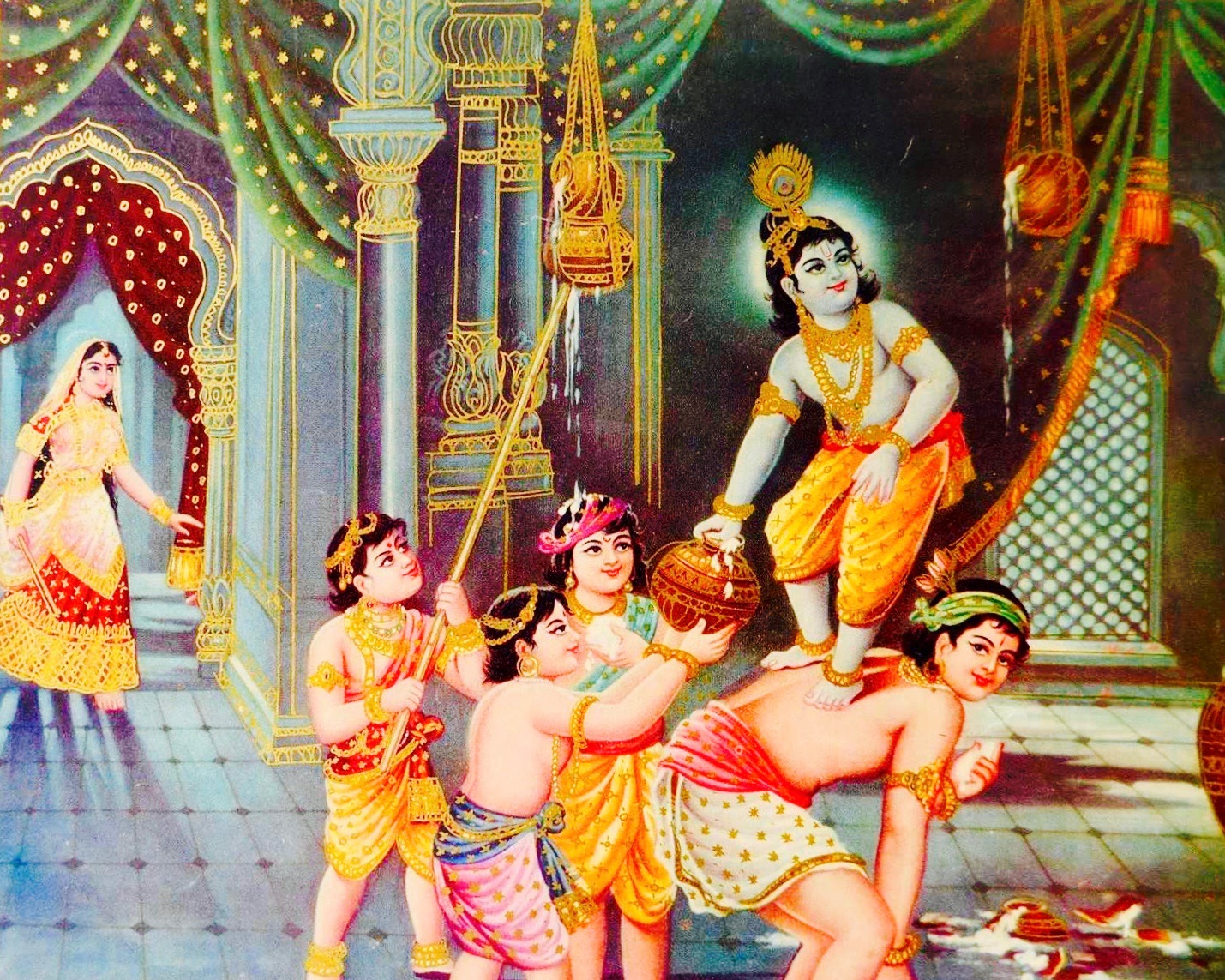
Krishna is celebrated in the Vaishnava tradition in various stages of his life.

The Chandogya Upanishad (Verse III.xvii.6) describes Krishna, in Krishnaya Devakiputraya, as a student of the sage Ghora of the Angirasa family. Ghora is identified with Neminatha, the twenty-second tirthankara in Jainism, by some scholars. Krishnaya Devakiputraya, which means "To Krishna the son of Devaki", has been mentioned by scholars such as Max Müller as a potential source of fables and Vedic lore about Krishna in the Mahabharata and other ancient literature – only potentially because this verse could have been interpolated into the text, or the Krishna Devakiputra could be different from the deity Krishna. These doubts are supported by the fact that the much later Sandilya Bhakti Sutras, a treatise on Krishna, cites later age compilations such as the Narayana Upanishad but never cites this verse of the Chandogya Upanishad. Other scholars disagree that the Krishna mentioned along with Devaki in the ancient Upanishad is unrelated to the later Hindu god of Bhagavad Gita fame. For example, Archer states that the coincidence of the two names appearing together in the same Upanishad verse cannot be dismissed easily.

Yāska's Nirukta, an etymological treatise published around the 6th century BCE, contains a reference to the Shyamantaka jewel in the possession of Akrura, a motif from the well-known Puranic story about Krishna. Shatapatha Brahmana and Aitareya-Aranyaka associate Krishna with his Vrishni origins.

In Ashṭādhyāyī, authored by the ancient grammarian Pāṇini (probably belonging to the 5th or 6th century BCE), Vāsudeva and Arjuna, as recipients of worship, are referred to together in the same sutra.

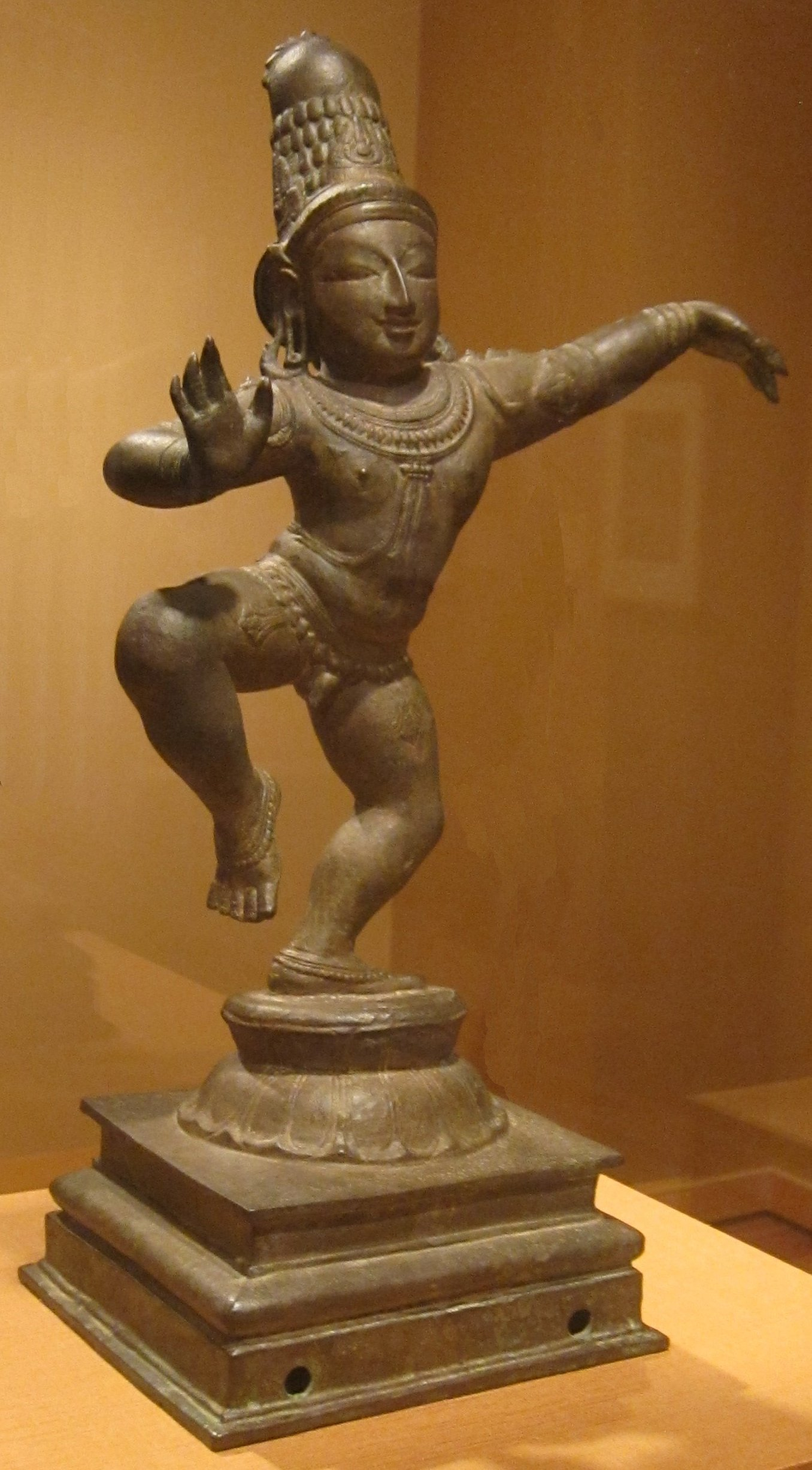
Bala Krishna dancing, 14th century CE Chola sculpture, Tamil Nadu, in the Honolulu Academy of Arts.

Megasthenes, a Greek ethnographer and an ambassador of Seleucus I to the court of Chandragupta Maurya towards the end of 4th century BCE, made reference to Herakles in his famous work Indica. This text is now lost to history, but was quoted in secondary literature by later Greeks such as Arrian, Diodorus, and Strabo. According to these later texts, Megasthenes mentioned that the Sourasenoi tribe of India, who worshipped Herakles, had two major cities named Methora and Kleisobora, and a navigable river named the Jobares. According to Edwin Bryant, "there is little doubt that the Sourasenoi refers to the Shurasenas, a branch of the Yadu dynasty to which Krishna belonged". The word Herakles, states Bryant, is likely a Greek phonetic equivalent of Hari-Krishna, as is Methora of Mathura, Kleisobora of Krishnapura, and the Jobares of Jamuna. Later, when Alexander the Great launched his campaign in the northwest Indian subcontinent, his associates recalled that the soldiers of Porus were carrying an image of Herakles.

The Buddhist Pali canon and the Ghata-Jâtaka (No. 454) polemically mention the devotees of Vâsudeva and Baladeva. These texts have many peculiarities and may be a garbled and confused version of the Krishna legends. Jain texts also mention Krishna themes, especially in works dedicated to Neminath, the twenty-second Tirthankara, traditionally regarded as Krishna's cousin. This inclusion of Krishna-related legends in ancient Buddhist and Jaina literature suggests that Krishna theology was important to the religious of ancient India.

The ancient Sanskrit grammarian Patanjali, in his Mahabhashya, makes several references to Krishna and his associates found in Indian texts. In his commentary on Pāṇini's verse 3.1.26, he uses the word Kamsavadha or the "killing of Kamsa", an important part of the legends surrounding Krishna.

==== Puranas ====
Many Puranas tell Krishna's life story or some highlights from it. Two Puranas, the Bhagavata Purana and the Vishnu Purana, contain the most elaborate telling of Krishna's story, but the life stories of Krishna in these and other texts vary, and contain significant inconsistencies. The Bhagavata Purana consists of twelve books subdivided into 332 chapters, with a cumulative total of between 16,000 and 18,000 verses, depending on the version. The tenth book of the text, which contains about 4,000 verses (approximately 25% of total verses) is dedicated to legends about Krishna, has been the most popular and widely studied part of this text.

=== Proposed dating and historicity ===
According to Guy Beck, most scholars of Hinduism and Indian history accept the historicity of Krishna, that Krishna was a historical figure, whether human or divine, who likely lived on Indian soil at least prior to 1000 BCE and interacted with many other historical persons included in the epic and puranic histories. Beck further notes that, however, there is enormous number of contradictions and discrepancies surrounding the chronology of Krishna's life as depicted in the Sanskrit canon.

Some scholars believe that, among others, the detailed description of Krishna's peace mission in the 5th book of the Mahabharata, ("Udyoga Parvan"), is likely based on real events. The epic's translator J.A.B. van Buitenen in this context assumes that there was some degree of verisimilitude in the Mahabharata's depictions of life.

== Iconography ==
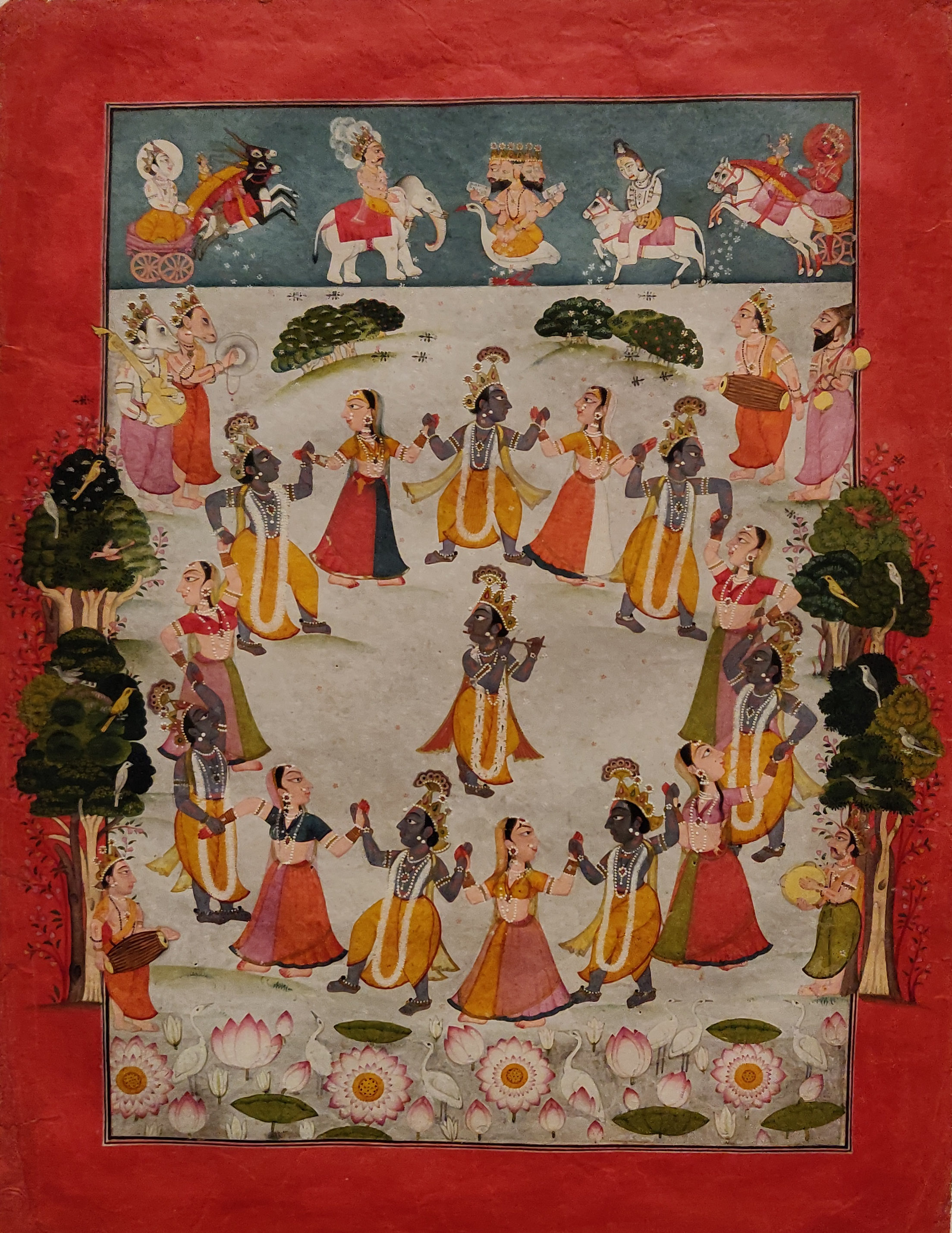
Krishna dances in the Raslila with the gopis

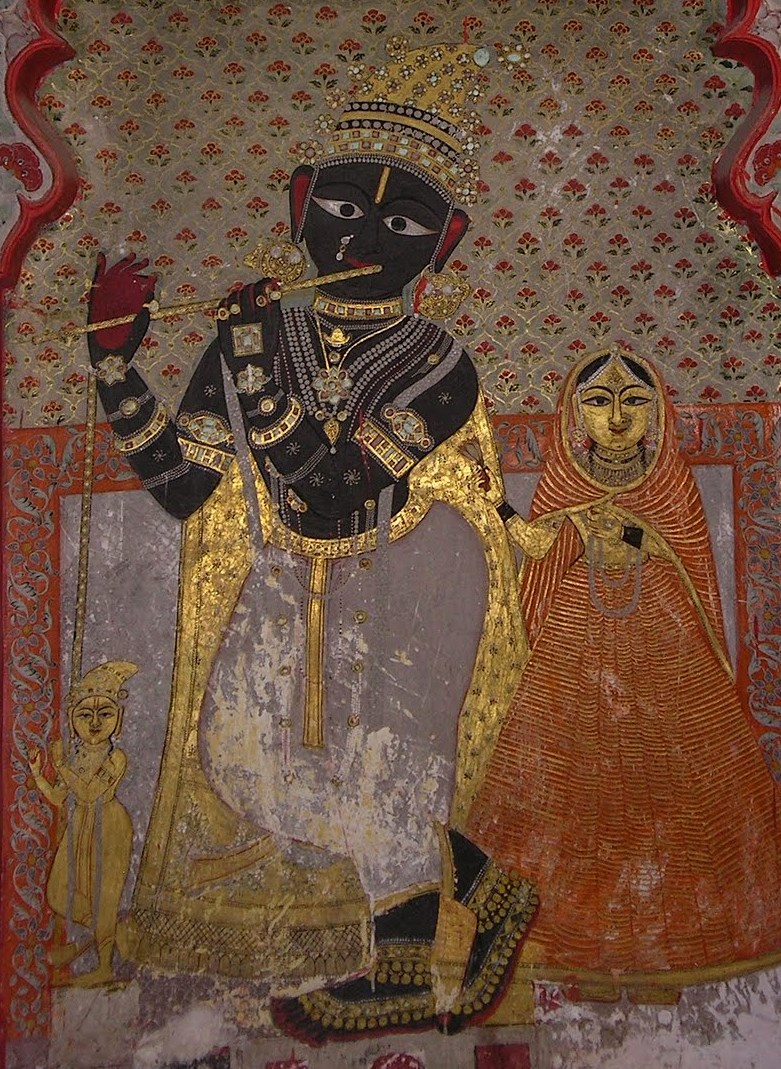
14th-century fresco of Radha Krishna in Udaipur, Rajasthan

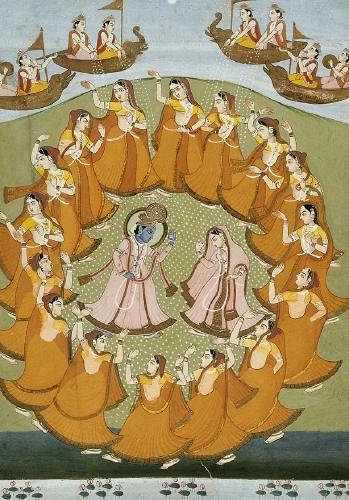
Rasalila painting, Jaipur, c. 19th century

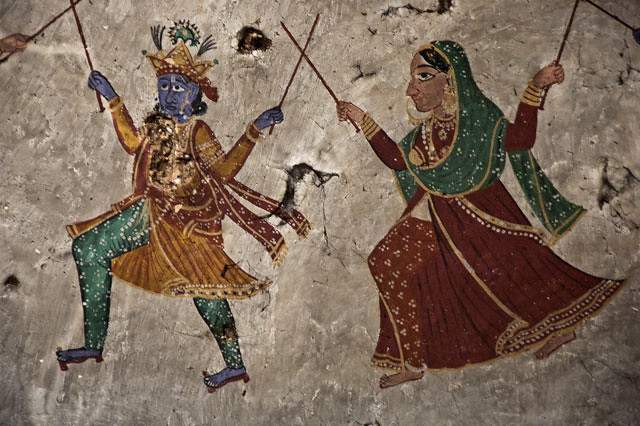
Rasalila fresco of Krishna with Radha

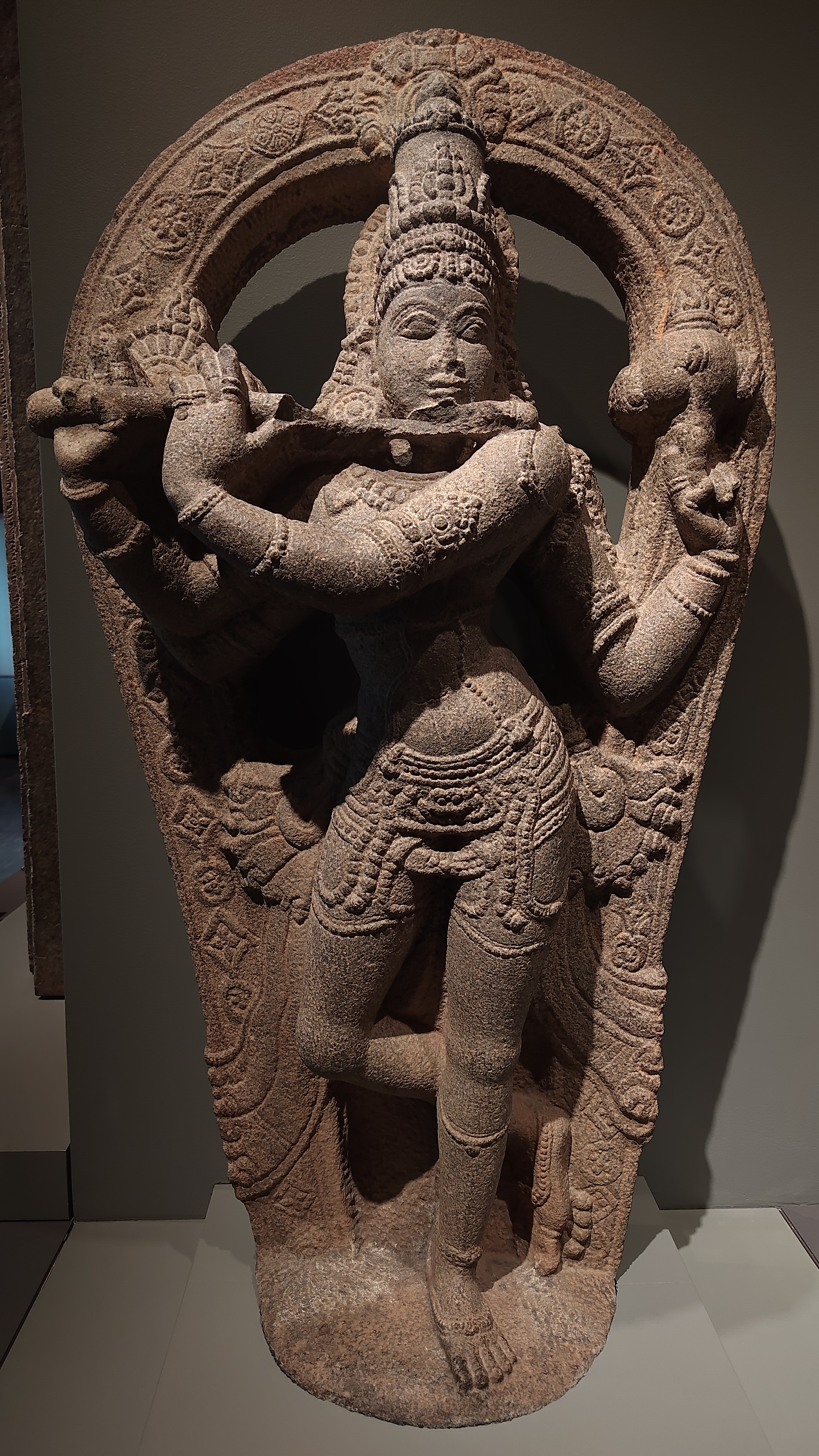
Krishna playing bansuri (Indian flute)

Indian traditions represent Krishna in many ways, but with some common features. His iconography typically depicts him with black, dark, or blue skin, like that of Vishnu. However, ancient and medieval reliefs and stone-based arts depict him in the natural color of the material out of which he is formed, both in India and in southeast Asia. In some texts, his skin is poetically described as the color of Jambul (Jamun, a black-colored fruit).

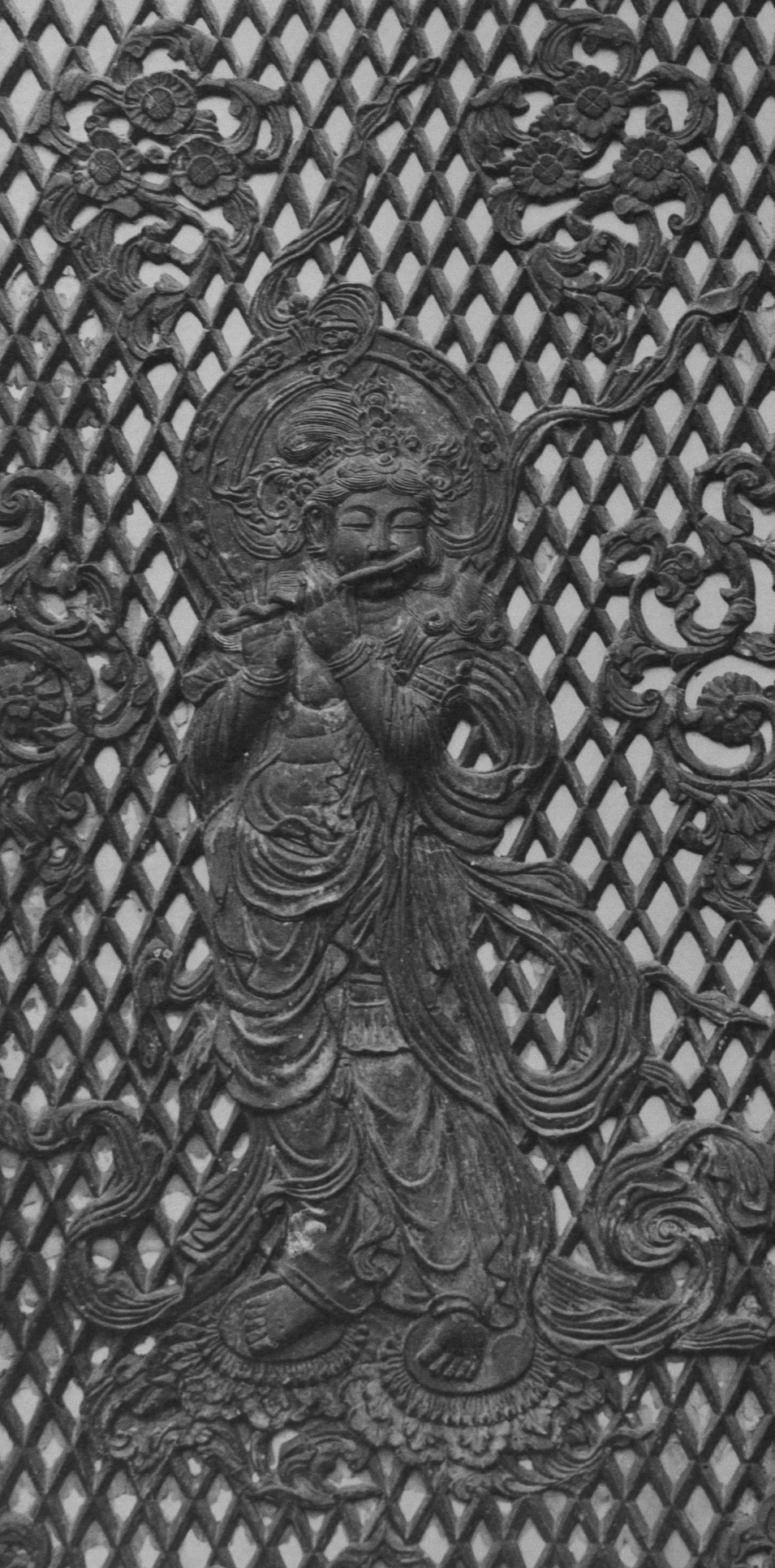
Depiction of Krishna playing the flute in Todai-ji Temple, constructed in 752 CE on the order of Emperor Shomu, in Nara, Japan

Krishna is often depicted wearing a peacock-feather wreath or crown, and playing the bansuri (Indian flute). In this form, he is usually shown standing with one leg bent in front of the other in the tribhanga posture. He is sometimes accompanied by cows or a calf, which symbolise the divine herdsman Govinda. Alternatively, he is shown as a romantic young boy with the gopi s (milkmaids), often playing music or playing pranks.

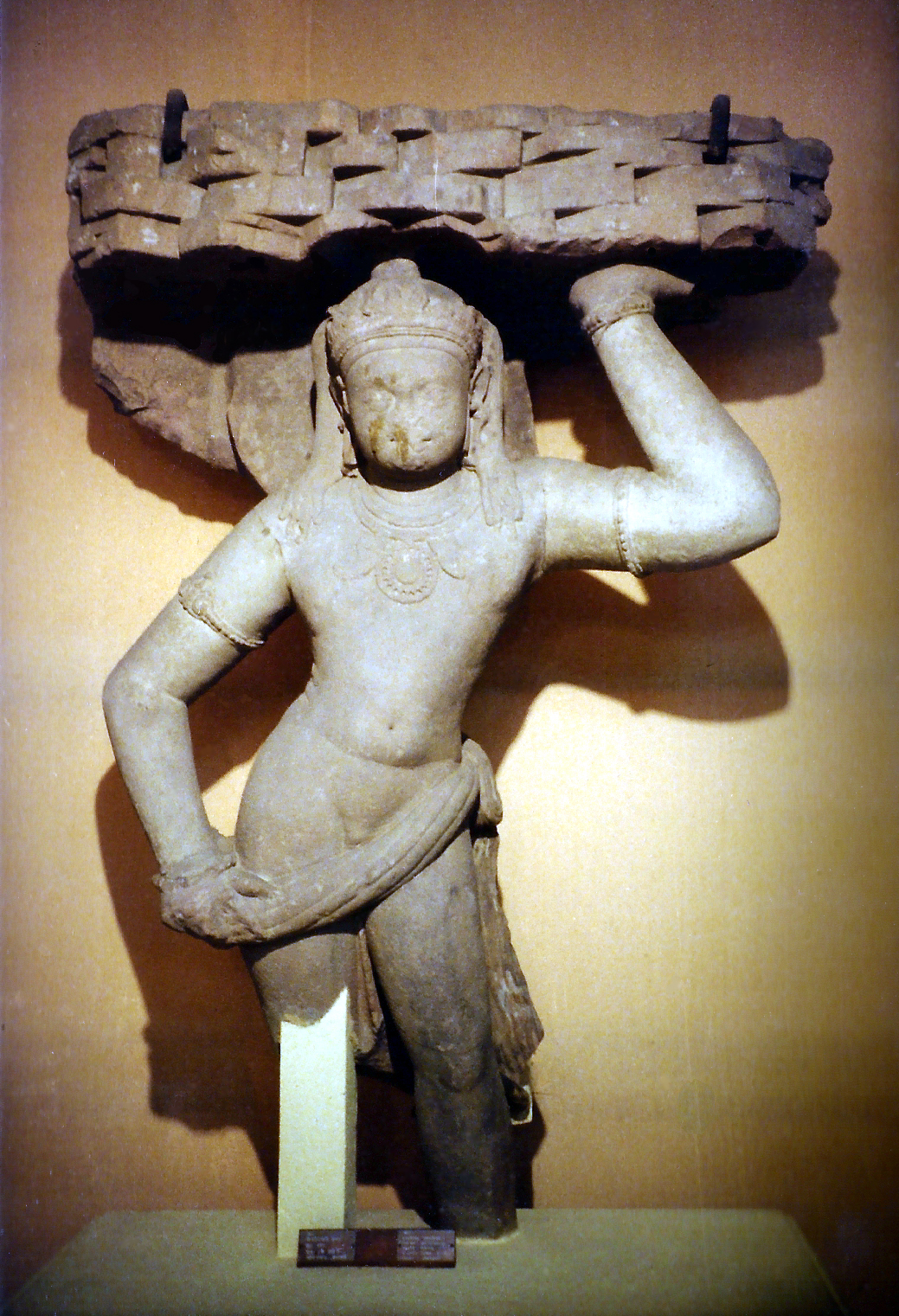
Krishna lifting Govardhana at Bharat Kala Bhavan, recovered from Varanasi. It is dated to the Gupta Empire era (4th-6th century CE).

In other depictions, he is a part of battlefield scenes of the Mahabharata. He is shown as a charioteer, while addressing Arjuna, symbolically reflecting the events that led to the Bhagavad Gita. In these depictions, Krishna appears in the front as the charioteer, either counseling Arjuna or as the driver of the chariot while Arjuna aims his arrows on the battlefield of Kurukshetra.

Alternate depictions of Krishna show him as a baby (Bala Krishna, the child Krishna), a toddler crawling on his hands and knees, a dancing child, or an innocent-looking child playfully stealing or consuming butter (depicted as Makhan Chor), holding Laddu in his hand (depicted as Laddu Gopal) or as a cosmic infant sucking his toe while floating on a banyan leaf during the Pralaya (the cosmic dissolution) observed by sage Markandeya.

Guidelines for the preparation of depictions of Krishna in architecture are described in medieval-era Sanskrit texts on Hindu temple arts such as Vaikhanasa agama, Vishnu dharmottara, Brihat samhita, and Agni Purana. Similarly, early medieval-era Tamil texts also contain guidelines for sculpting Krishna and Rukmini. Several statues made according to these guidelines are in the collections of the Government Museum, Chennai.

Krishna iconography forms an important element in the figural sculpture in the 17th–19th century terracotta temples of Bengal. In many temples, the stories of Krishna are depicted on a long series of narrow panels along the base of the facade. In other temples, the important Krishna-lila episodes are depicted on large brick panels above the entrance arches or on the walls surrounding the entrance.

== Life and legends ==
This summary is an account based on literary details from the Mahabharata, the Harivamsa, the Bhagavata Purana, and the Vishnu Purana. The scenes from these narratives are set in ancient India, mostly in the present states of Uttar Pradesh, Bihar, Rajasthan, Haryana, Delhi, and Gujarat. The legends about Krishna's life are called Krishna charitas.

=== Birth ===
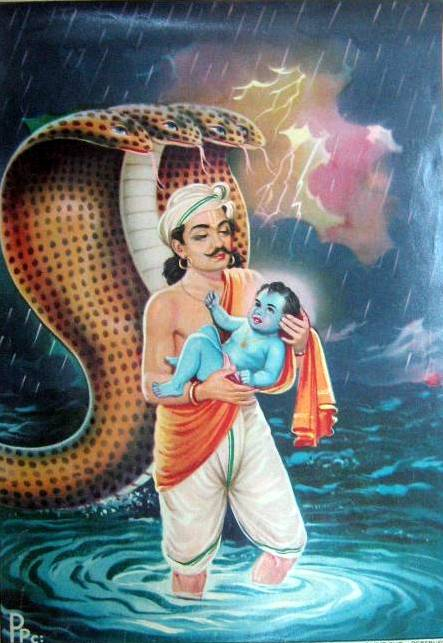
Vasudeva carrying infant Krishna across Yamuna

Krishna was born to Devaki and her husband, Vasudeva, in a prison of Mathura. Devaki's brother is a tyrant named Kamsa. At Devaki's wedding, according to Puranic legends, Kamsa is told by fortune tellers that the eighth child of Devaki would kill him, while in some texts, it is depicted as an akashvani (divine voice) announcing his death. Seeking to forestall this prophecy, Kamsa arranges to kill all of Devaki's children as soon as they are born. Kamsa would have done the same to Krishna, but when Krishna is born, all the jailers miraculously fall into a deep sleep and the prison door is opened. Vasudeva secretly carries the infant Krishna across the Yamuna, and manages to exchange him with Yashoda's daughter, and returns with that girl. When Kamsa tries to kill the newborn girl, the exchanged baby appears as the Hindu goddess Yogamaya, who warns him that the one who will kill him has already been born in his kingdom, and then disappears. Krishna grows up with his foster parents, Nanda and Yashoda, near modern-day Mathura. Krishna's place of birth is marked by the Krishna Janmbhumi Temple. The day of the birth of Krishna is celebrated as Krishna Janmashtami. Two of Krishna's siblings, Balarama and Subhadra, also survive, according to these legends.

=== Childhood and youth ===
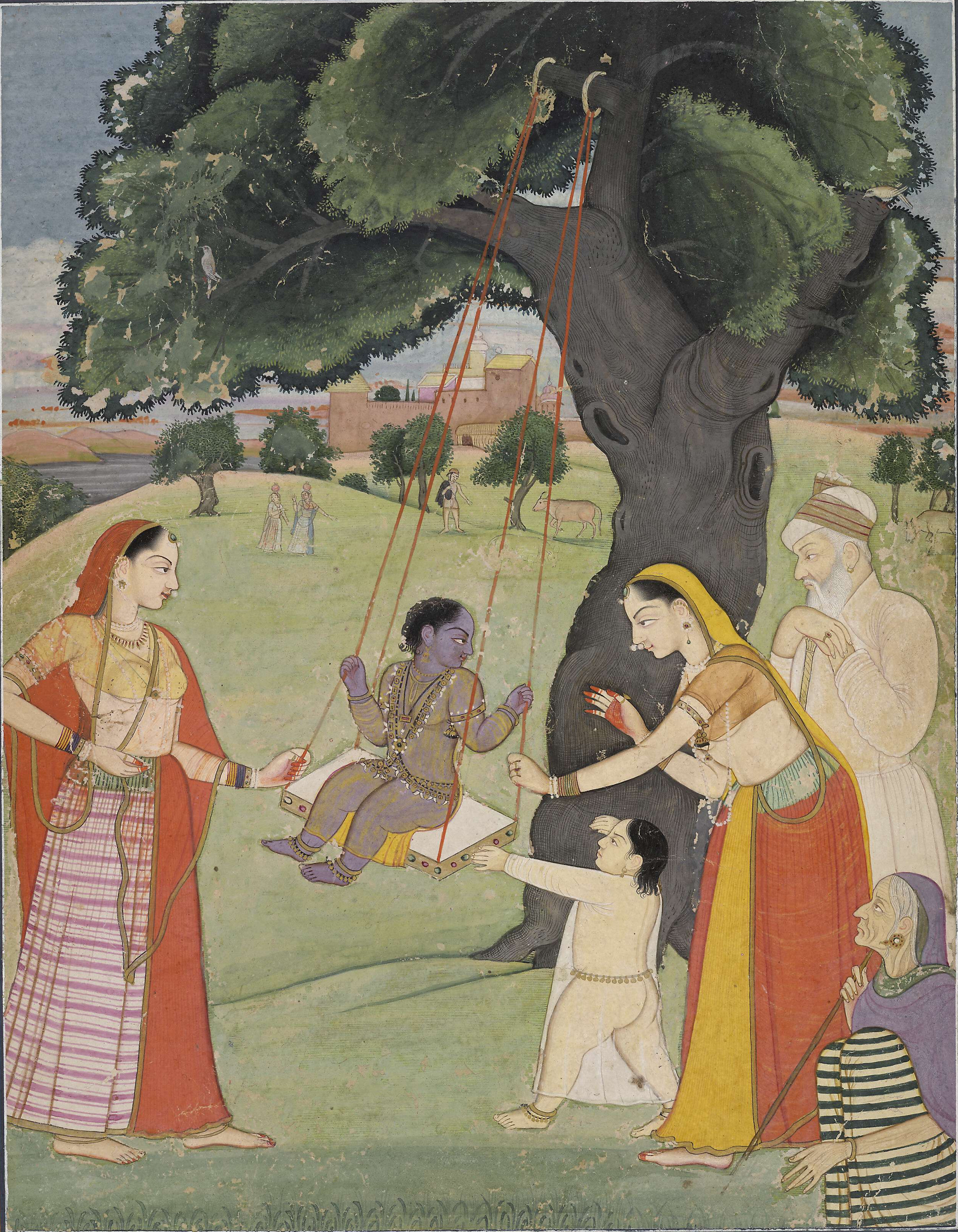
Baby Krishna on a swing, depicted with his foster parents Nanda and Yashoda.

The legends of Krishna's childhood and youth describe him as a cow-herder, a mischievous boy whose pranks earn him the nickname Makhan Chor (butter thief), and a protector who steals the hearts of the people in both Gokul and Vrindavana. The texts state, for example, that Krishna lifts the Govardhana hill to protect the inhabitants of Vrindavana from devastating rains and floods.

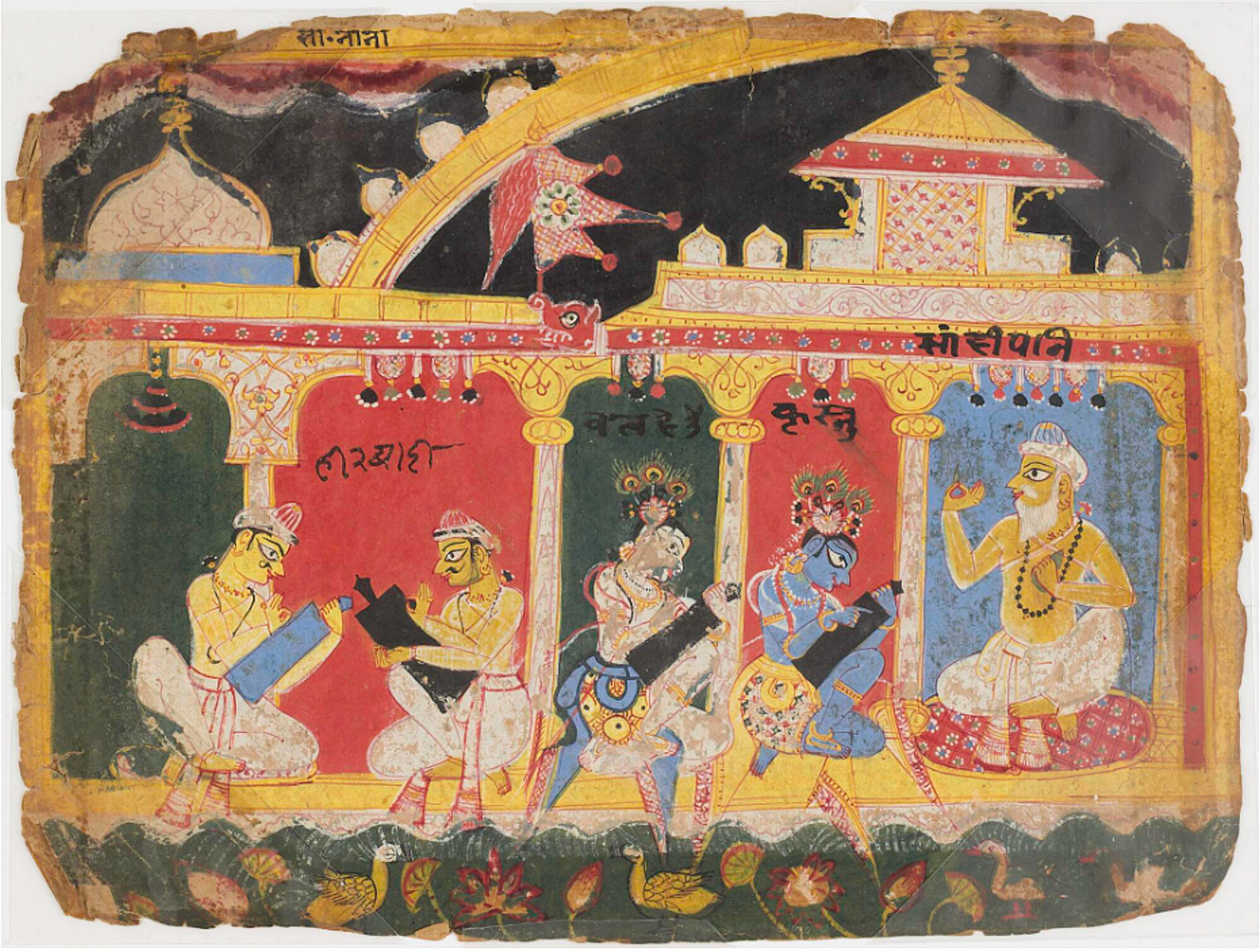
Krishna and Balarama Studying with the Brahman Sandipani (Bhagavata Purana, 1525–1550 CE print).

Other legends describe him as an enchanter and playful lover of the gopis (milkmaids) of Vrindavana, especially Radha. These metaphor-filled love stories are known as the Rasa lila and were romanticized in the poetry of Jayadeva, author of the Gita Govinda. They are also central to the development of the Krishna bhakti traditions worshiping Radha Krishna.

Krishna's childhood illustrates the Hindu concept of Lila, playing for fun and enjoyment and not for sport or gain. His interaction with the gopis at the Rasa-lila, or Ras dance, is an example. Krishna plays his flute and the gopis come immediately, dropping whatever they were doing, to the banks of the Yamuna River and join him in singing and dancing. Even those who could not physically be there join him through meditation. He is the spiritual essence and the love-eternal in existence, the gopis metaphorically represent the prakṛti matter and the impermanent body.

This Lila is a constant theme in the legends of Krishna's childhood and youth. Even when he is battling with a serpent to protect others, he is described in Hindu texts as if he were playing a game. This quality of playfulness in Krishna is celebrated during festivals as Rasa-Lila and Janmashtami, where Hindus in some regions such as Maharashtra playfully mimic his legends, such as by making human gymnastic pyramids to break open handis (clay pots) hung high in the air to "steal" butter or buttermilk, spilling it all over the group.

=== Adulthood ===
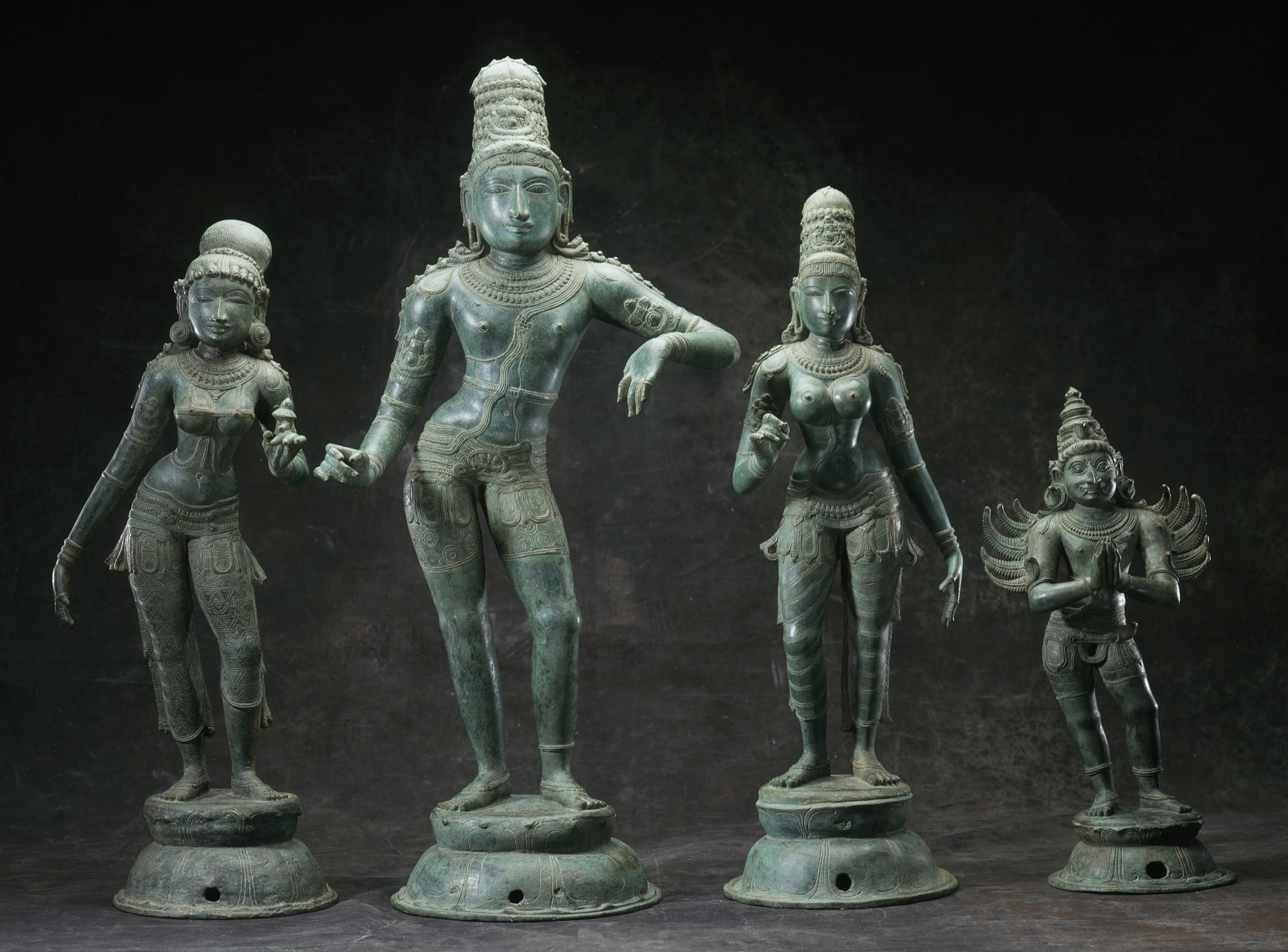
Krishna with his consorts Rukmini and Satyabhama and his mount Garuda, Tamil Nadu, India, late 12th–13th century

Krishna legends then describe his return to Mathura. He overthrows and kills the tyrant king, his maternal uncle Kamsa, after foiling several assassination attempts by Kamsa. He reinstates Kamsa's father, Ugrasena, as the king of the Yadavas and becomes a leading prince at the court. In one version of the Krishna story, as narrated by Shanta Rao, Krishna, after Kamsa's death, leads the Yadavas to the newly built city of Dwaraka. Thereafter, the Pandavas rise. Krishna befriends Arjuna and the other Pandava princes of the Kuru kingdom. Krishna plays a key role in the Mahabharata.

The Bhagavata Purana lists eight wives of Krishna, who appear in sequence as Rukmini, Satyabhama, Jambavati, Kalindi, Mitravinda, Nagnajiti (also called Satya), Bhadra, and Lakshmana (also called Madra). This has been interpreted as a metaphor where each of the eight wives signifies a different aspect of him. Vaishnava texts mention all gopis as wives of Krishna, but this is understood as spiritual symbolism of devotional relationship and Krishna's complete loving devotion to each and everyone devoted to him.

In Krishna-related Hindu traditions, he is most commonly seen with Radha. All of his wives and his lover Radha are considered in the Hindu tradition to be the avatars of the goddess Lakshmi, the consort of Vishnu. Gopis are considered as manifestations of Lakshmi or Radha.

=== Kurukshetra War and Bhagavad Gita ===
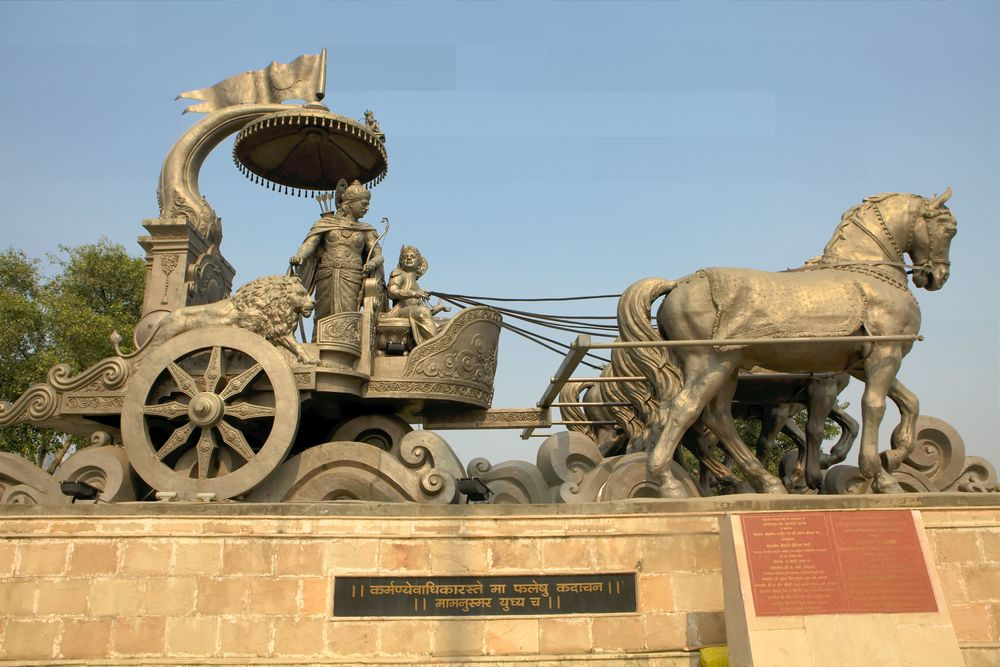
Temple sculpture of Krishna and Arjuna located at Kurukshetra

According to the epic poem Mahabharata, Krishna becomes Arjuna's charioteer for the Kurukshetra War, but on the condition that he personally will not raise any weapon. Upon arrival at the battlefield and seeing that the enemies are his family, his grandfather, and his cousins and loved ones, Arjuna is moved and says his heart will not allow him to fight and kill others. He would rather renounce the kingdom and put down his Gandiva (Arjuna's bow). Krishna then advises him about the nature of life, ethics, and morality when one is faced with a war between good and evil; the impermanence of matter; the permanence of the soul and the good; duties and responsibilities; the nature of true peace and bliss; and the different types of yoga needed to reach a state of bliss and inner liberation. This conversation between Krishna and Arjuna is presented as a discourse called the Bhagavad Gita.

=== Death and ascension ===
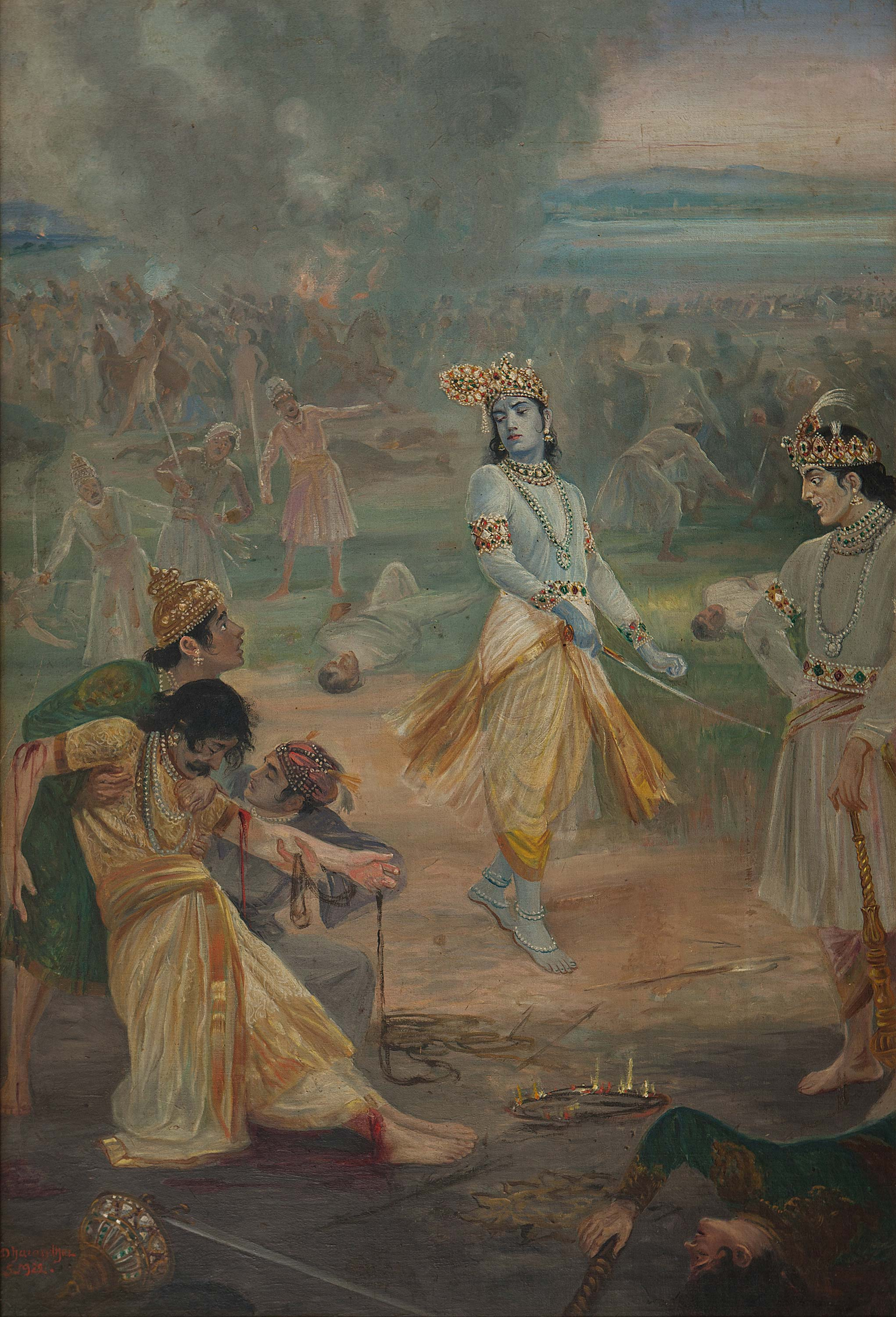
Yadavas killing themselves, with Krishna and his brother Balarama depicted at right, illustration by M. V. Dhurandhar

The Indian texts state that the legendary Kurukshetra War led to the death of all one hundred sons of Gandhari. After Duryodhana's death, Krishna visits Gandhari to offer his condolences when Gandhari and Dhritarashtra visit Kurukshetra, as stated in "Stree Parva". Feeling that Krishna deliberately did not put an end to the war, in a fit of rage and sorrow Gandhari said, "Thou were indifferent to the Kurus and the Pandavas whilst they slew each other. Therefore, O Govinda, thou shalt be the slayer of thy own kinsmen!" According to the Mahabharata, a fight breaks out at a festival among the Yadavas, who end up killing each other.

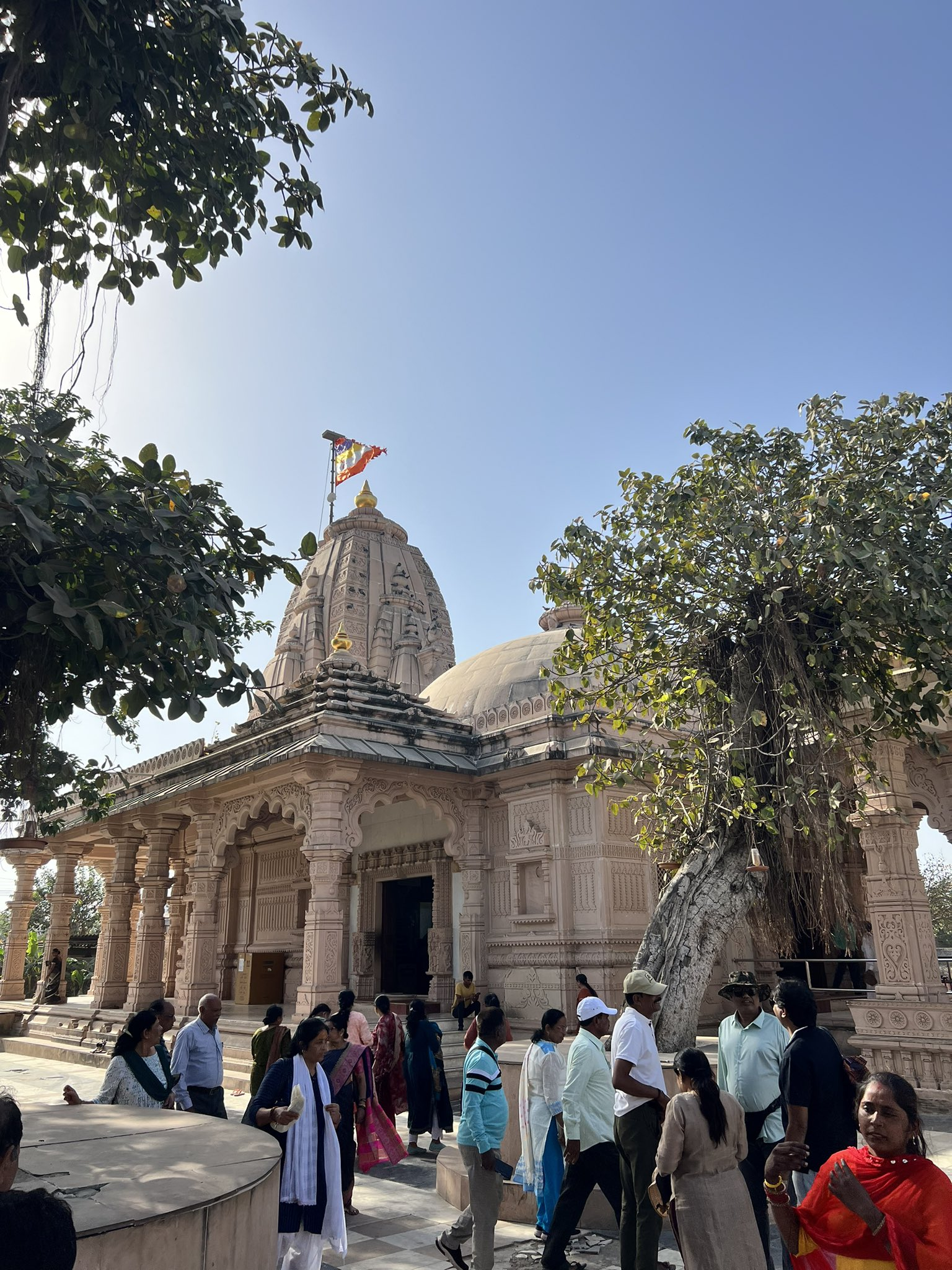
Temple at Bhalka marking the site where Krishna took his last breath

Mistaking the sleeping Krishna for a deer, a hunter named Jara shoots an arrow towards Krishna's foot that fatally injures him. Krishna forgives Jara and dies. The pilgrimage (tirtha) site of Bhalka in Gujarat marks the location where Krishna is believed to have died. It is also known as Dehotsarga, states Diana L. Eck, a term that literally means the place where Krishna "gave up his body". Krishna returned to his transcendent abode, Vaikunth, directly because of his yogic concentration. Waiting gods such as Brahma and Indra were unable to trace the path Krishna took to leave his human incarnation and return to his abode.

=== Versions and interpretations ===
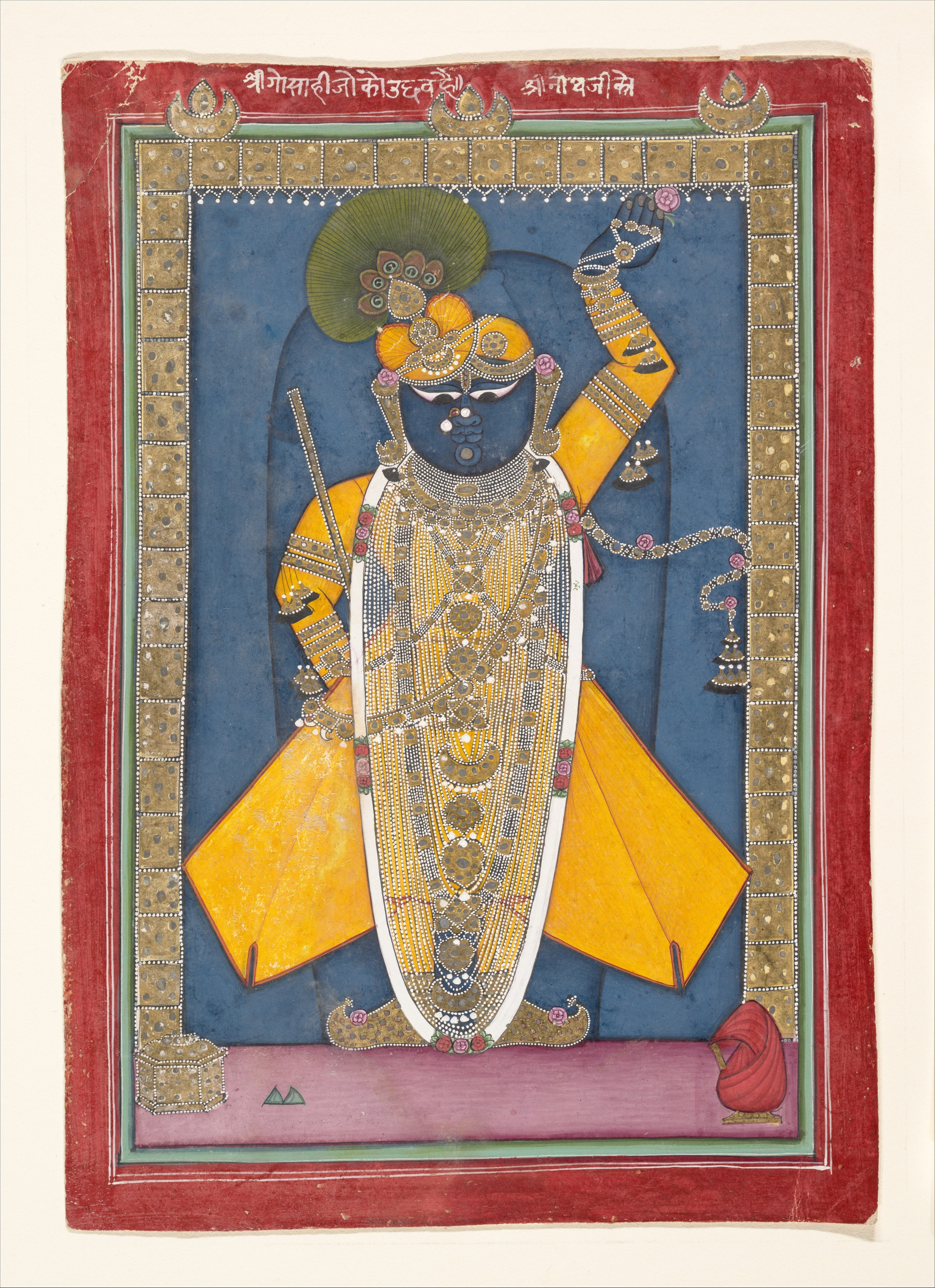
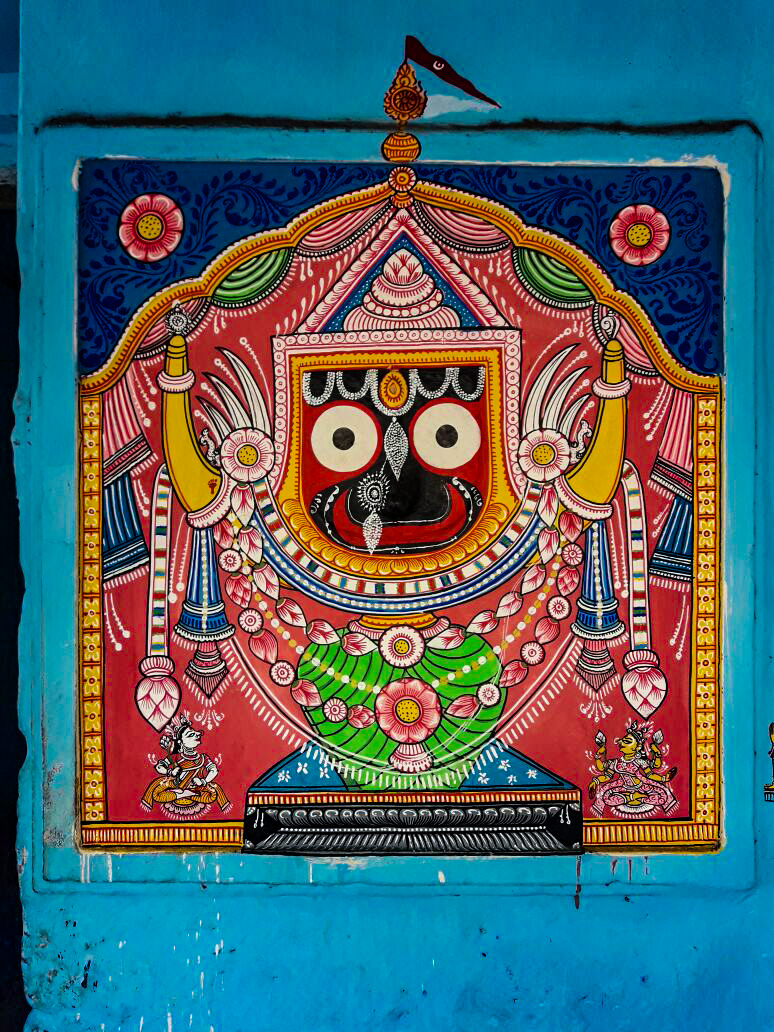
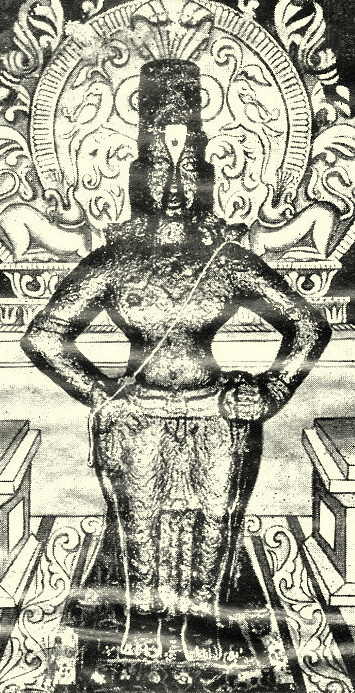
Krishna iconography appears in many versions across India. For example (left to right): Srinath, Jagannath, Vithoba.

There are numerous versions of Krishna's life story, of which three are most studied: the Harivamsa, the Bhagavata Purana, and the Vishnu Purana. They share the basic storyline but vary significantly in their specifics and styles. (Note: Within a period of four or five centuries [around the start of the common era], we encounter our major sources of information, all in different versions. The Mahabharata, the Harivamsa, the Visnu Purana, the Ghata Jataka, and the Bala Carita all appear between the first and the fifth century AD, and each of them represents a tradition of a Krsna cycle different from the others) The most original composition, the Harivamsa, is told in a realistic style that describes Krishna's life as a poor herder but weaves in poetic and allusive fantasy. It ends on a triumphal note, not with the death of Krishna. Differing in some details, the fifth book of the Vishnu Purana moves away from Harivamsa realism and embeds Krishna in mystical terms and eulogies. The Vishnu Purana manuscripts exist in many versions.

The tenth and eleventh books of the Bhagavata Purana are widely considered to be a poetic masterpiece, full of imagination and metaphors, with no relation to the realism of pastoral life found in the Harivamsa. Krishna's life is presented as a cosmic play (Lila), where his youth is set as a princely life with his foster father Nanda portrayed as a king. Krishna's life is closer to that of a human being in Harivamsa, but is a symbolic universe in the Bhagavata Purana, where Krishna is always within the universe and beyond it, as well as being the universe itself. The Bhagavata Purana manuscripts also exist in many versions, in numerous Indian languages.

== Krishna Janmashtami ==
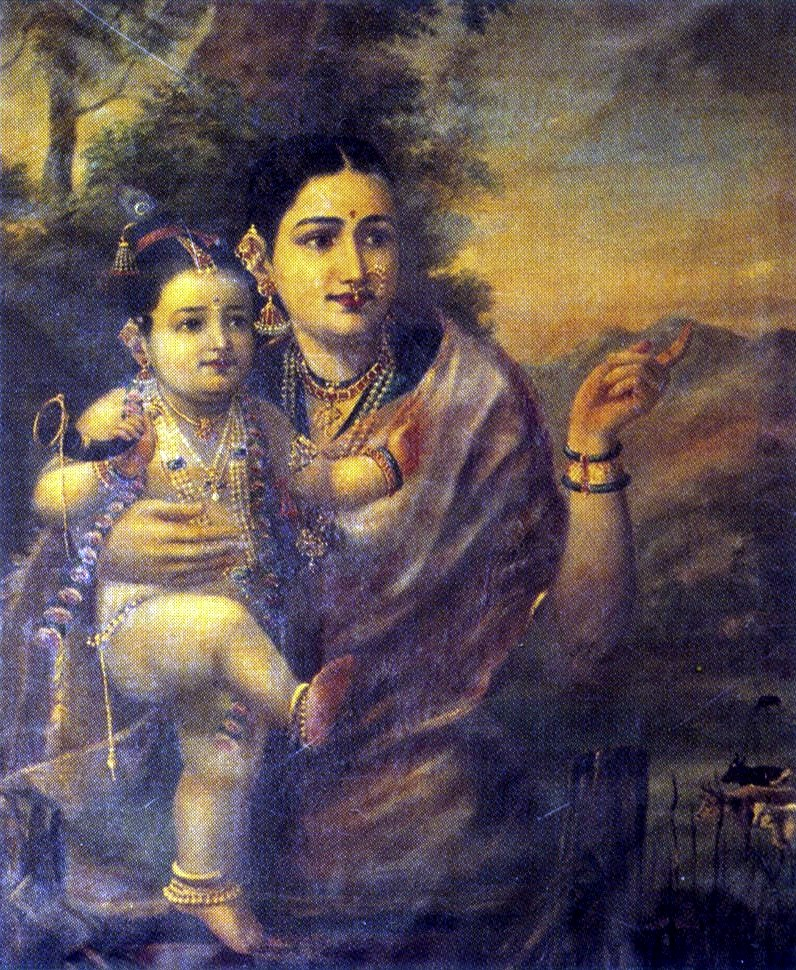
Krishna, as a young child with his foster mother, Yashoda

Krishna Janmashtami, also known as Krishnashtami, Janmashtami, or Gokulashtami, is one of the most important festivals associated with Krishna, alongside Holi. The date of Krishna's birth is celebrated every year. The name Janmastami derives from the Sanskrit words janma, meaning "birth", and ashtami, meaning the eighth day of the Hindu lunar fortnight. Janmashtami is celebrated in diverse forms, depending on regional and cultural customs. Hindus celebrate Janmashtami by fasting, singing, praying together, preparing and sharing special food, night vigils, and visiting Krishna or Vishnu temples. Krishna's birth is celebrated and observed on the eighth day (ashtami) of the dark fortnight (Krishna Paksha) in Shravana Masa (according to the amanta tradition) or Bhadrapada Masa, according to lunisolar Hindu calendar, which is often equivalent to late August or early September of the Gregorian calendar .

=== North India ===
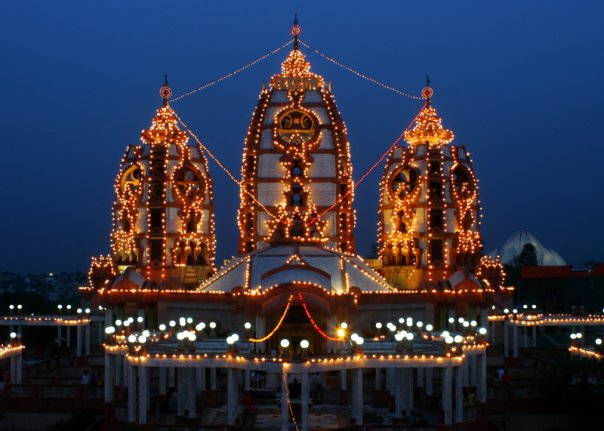
ISKCON Temple, Delhi during Janmashtami

Janmashtami is the largest festival in North India, particularly the Braj region. Cities such as Mathura and Vrindavan, where Krishna was born and spent most of his childhood, are considered sacred pilgrimage sites in Hinduism and are visited by millions of people during the festival. Vaishnava communities in these cities in Uttar Pradesh, as well as others in the state, as well as locations in Rajasthan, Delhi, Haryana, Uttarakhand, and the Himalayan north celebrate Janmashtami. Krishna temples are decorated and lit up; they attract numerous visitors on the day, while Krishna devotees hold bhakti events and keep night vigils.

== Philosophy and theology ==
A wide range of theological and philosophical ideas are presented through Krishna in Hindu texts. The teachings of the Bhagavad Gita can be considered as the first Krishnaite system of theology, according to Friedhelm Hardy.

Ramanuja, a Hindu theologian and philosopher whose works were influential in the Bhakti movement, presented Krishna in terms of qualified monism, or nondualism (namely, the Vishishtadvaita school). Madhvacharya, a philosopher whose works led to the founding of the Haridasa tradition of Vaishnavism, presented Krishna in the framework of dualism (Dvaita). Bhedabheda—a group of schools, which teaches that the individual self is both different and not different from the ultimate reality—predates monism and dualism. Among medieval Bhedabheda thinkers are Nimbarkacharya, who founded the Nimbarka Sampradaya (of Dvaitadvaita Vedanta), and Jiva Goswami, a saint in Gaudiya Vaishnavism, who described Krishnaite theology in terms of Bhakti yoga and Achintya Bheda Abheda. Krishnaite theology is presented in a pure monism (Shuddhadvaita) framework by Vallabha Acharya, the founder of the Pushtimarg sect of Vaishnavism. Madhusūdana Sarasvatī, an Indian philosopher, developed a theology of Krishna using a nondualism-monism framework (Advaita Vedanta), while Adi Shankara, credited with unifying and establishing the main currents of thought in Hinduism, mentioned Krishna in his early eighth-century discussions on Panchayatana puja.

The Bhagavata Purana synthesizes an Advaita, Samkhya, and Yoga framework of Krishna that is based on loving devotion to Krishna. Bryant describes the synthesis of ideas in the Bhagavata Purana:

The philosophy of the Bhagavata is a mixture of Vedanta terminology, Samkhyan metaphysics, and devotionalized Yoga praxis. (...) The tenth book promotes Krishna as the highest absolute personal aspect of godhead – the personality behind the term Ishvara and the ultimate aspect of Brahman.

— Edwin Bryant, Krishna: A Sourcebook

While Sheridan and Pintchman both affirm Bryant's view, the latter adds that the Vedantic view emphasized in the Bhagavata is non-dualist with a difference. In conventional nondual Vedanta, all reality is interconnected and one; the Bhagavata posits that reality is interconnected and plural.

Across various theologies and philosophies, a common theme presents Krishna as the essence and symbol of divine love, with human life and love reflecting the divine. The longing and love-filled legends of Krishna and the gopis, his playful pranks as a baby, as well as his later dialogues with other figures, are philosophically treated as metaphors for the human longing for the divine and for meaning, and the play between the universals and the human soul. Krishna's lila is a theology of love-play. According to John Koller, "Love is presented not simply as a means to salvation, it is the highest life". Human love is God's love.

Other texts that describe Krishna's life, such as the Bhagavad Gita, have attracted numerous bhasya (commentaries) in the Hindu traditions. Though only a part of the Mahabharata, the Bhagavad Gita itself has 700 verses divided into 18 chapters where Krishna, as a charioteer, guides Arjuna towards the path of dharma when Arjuna hesitated to fight against his own relatives and elders, whom he deeply respected, on the battlefield of Kurukshetra. Seeing Arjuna's confusion, Krishna shares his philosophical teachings and reminds Arjuna of his responsibility to protect the truth. The Bhagavad Gita allegorically poses the ethical and moral dilemmas of human life through the discussion between Krishna and Arjuna. It then presents answers, addressing the questions of human freedoms, choices, and responsibilities towards self and others. This Krishna dialogue has attracted numerous interpretations, from being a metaphor for inner human struggle that teaches non-violence to being a metaphor for outer human struggle that advocates a rejection of quietism and persecution.

Madhusūdana Sarasvatī, known for his contributions to classical Advaita Vedanta, was also a devotee of Krishna and expressed his devotion in various verses within his works, notably in his Bhagavad Gita commentary, Bhagavad Gita Gudarthadipika. In his works, Krishna is identified as the supreme deity and as Bhagavan, whom Madhusudana describes as the non-dual Self, embodying being, consciousness, and bliss, the pure existence underlying all. In his commentary, Krishna is often interpreted as representing Nirguna Brahman, thus presenting a transtheistic understanding of deity.

== Influence ==
=== Vaishnavism ===
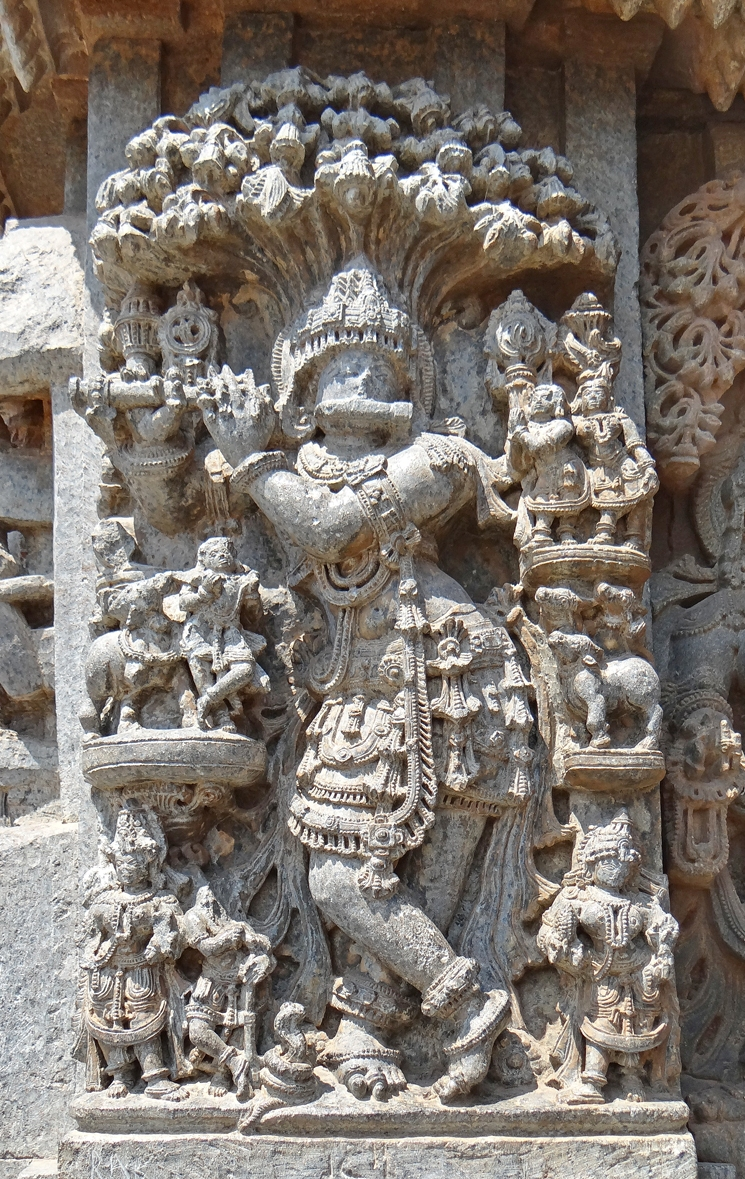
Relief from the Chennakeshava Temple of Krishna with flute with humans and cows listening, 1258 CE.

The worship of Krishna is part of Vaishnavism, a major tradition within Hinduism. Krishna is considered a full avatar of Vishnu, or one with Vishnu himself. However, the exact relationship between Krishna and Vishnu is complex and diverse, with Krishna of Krishnaite sampradayas considered an independent supreme deity. Vaishnavas accept many incarnations of Vishnu, but Krishna is particularly important. Their theologies are generally centered either on Vishnu or an avatar such as Krishna as supreme. The terms Krishnaism and Vishnuism have sometimes been used to distinguish the two, the former implying that Krishna is the transcendent supreme being. Some scholars, such as Friedhelm Hardy, do not define Krishnaism as a sub-order or offshoot of Vaishnavism, considering it a parallel and no less ancient current of Hinduism.

All Vaishnava traditions recognise Krishna as the eighth avatar of Vishnu; others identify Krishna with Vishnu, while Krishnaite traditions such as Gaudiya Vaishnavism, Ekasarana Dharma, Mahanam Sampraday, Nimbarka Sampradaya, and the Vallabha Sampradaya regard Krishna as not just an avatar of Vishnu, but as the Svayam Bhagavan, the original form of Lord or the same as the concept of Brahman in Hinduism. Gitagovinda of Jayadeva considers Krishna to be the supreme lord while the ten incarnations are his forms. Swaminarayan, the founder of the Swaminarayan Sampradaya, also worshipped Krishna as God himself. "Greater Krishnaism" corresponds to the second and dominant phase of Vaishnavism, revolving around the cults of the Vasudeva, Krishna, and Gopala of the late Vedic period. Today this faith has a significant following outside of India as well.

==== Early traditions ====
The deity Krishna-Vāsudeva (kṛṣṇa vāsudeva – Krishna, the son of Vasudeva) is historically one of the earliest forms of worship in Krishnaism and Vaishnavism. It is believed to be a significant tradition of the early history of Krishna religion in antiquity. Thereafter, there was an amalgamation of various similar traditions. These include ancient Bhagavatism, the cult of Gopala, of "Krishna Govinda" (cow-finding Krishna), of Balakrishna (baby Krishna), and of "Krishna Gopivallabha" (Krishna the lover). (Note: Present-day Krishna worship is an amalgam of various elements. According to historical testimonies, Krishna-Vasudeva worship already flourished in and around Mathura several centuries before Christ. A second important element is the cult of Krishna Govinda. Still later is the worship of Bala-Krishna, the Child Krishna – a quite prominent feature of modern Krishnaism. The last element seems to have been Krishna Gopijanavallabha, Krishna the lover of the Gopis, among whom Radha occupies a special position. In some books, Krishna is presented as the founder and first teacher of the Bhagavata religion.) According to Andre Couture, the Harivamsa contributed to the synthesis of various figures as aspects of Krishna.

Already in the early Middle Ages, Jagannathism (a.k.a. Odia Vaishnavism) originated as the cult of the god Jagannath (lit. ''Lord of the Universe'') – an abstract form of Krishna. Jagannathism was a regional temple-centered version of Krishnaism, where Jagannath is understood as a principal god, Purushottama and Para Brahman, but can also be regarded as a non-sectarian syncretic Vaishnavite and all-Hindu cult. According to the Vishnudharma Purana (c. 4th century), Krishna is worshipped in the form of Purushottama in Odia (Odisha).

=== Bhakti tradition ===
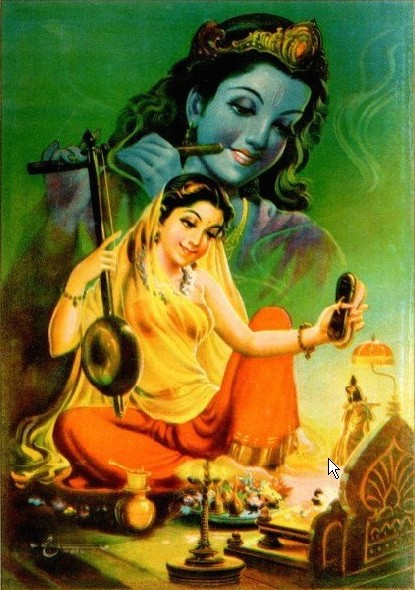
Krishna has been a major part of the Bhakti movement. One of the key devotees was Meera (pictured).

The use of the term bhakti, transl. devotion in Sanskrit, is not confined to any particular deity. However, Krishna is an important and popular focus of the devotionalism tradition within Hinduism, particularly among the Vaishnava and Krishnaite sects. Devotees of Krishna subscribe to the concept of lila, meaning 'divine play', as the central principle of the universe. It is a form of bhakti yoga, one of three types of yoga discussed by Krishna in the Bhagavad Gita.

==== Indian subcontinent ====
Bhakti movements devoted to Krishna became prominent in southern India in the 7th to 9th centuries CE. The earliest works included those of the Alvar saints of Tamil Nadu. A major collection of their works is the Divya Prabandham. Alvar Andal's popular collection of songs, Tiruppavai, in which she conceives of herself as a gopi, is the most famous of the oldest works in this genre.

The movement originated in South India during the 7th century CE, spreading northwards from Tamil Nadu through Karnataka and Maharashtra; by the 15th century, it was established in Bengal and northern India. Early Krishnaite bhakti pioneers include Nimbarkacharya (7th century CE) (Note: "The first Kṛṣṇaite sampradāya was developed by Nimbārka.") and his disciple Srinivasacharya; but most emerged later, including Vallabhacharya (15th century CE) and Chaitanya Mahaprabhu. They started their own schools, namely Nimbarka Sampradaya, Vallabha Sampradaya, and Gaudiya Vaishnavism, with Krishna and Radha as the supreme gods. In addition, since the 15th century, flourished the Tantric variety of Krishnaism, Vaishnava-Sahajiya, which is linked to the Bengali poet Chandidas.

In the Deccan, particularly in Maharashtra, poet saints of the Warkari sect, such as Dnyaneshwar, Namdev, Janabai, Eknath, and Tukaram, promoted the worship of Vithoba, a regional form of Krishna, from the 13th to 18th centuries. Before the Warkari tradition, devotion to Krishna became well established in Maharashtra due to the rise of the Mahanubhava Sampradaya founded by Sarvajna Chakradhara. The Pranami Sampradaya emerged in the 17th century in Gujarat, based on the Krishna-focussed syncretist Hindu-Islamic teachings of Devchandra Maharaj and his famous successor, Mahamati Prannath. In southern India, Purandara Dasa and Kanakadasa of Karnataka composed songs devoted to the Krishna image of Udupi. Rupa Goswami, of Gaudiya Vaishnavism, has compiled a comprehensive summary of bhakti called Bhakti-rasamrita-sindhu.

In South India, the acharyas of the Sri Sampradaya have written reverently about Krishna in most of their works, including Andal's Tiruppavai and Gopalavimshati by Vedanta Desika.

==== Outside Asia ====
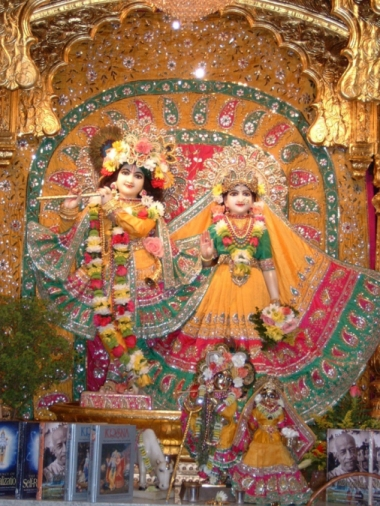
Krishna (left) with Radha at Bhaktivedanta Manor, Watford, England

By 1965, the Krishna-bhakti movement had spread outside India after Bhaktivedanta Swami Prabhupada (as instructed by his guru, Bhaktisiddhanta Sarasvati Thakura) travelled from his homeland in West Bengal to New York City. In July 1966, he founded the International Society for Krishna Consciousness (ISKCON), popularly known as the Hare Krishna movement. The purpose of this movement was to write about Krishna in English and to share the Gaudiya Vaishnava philosophy with people in the Western world by spreading the teachings of Chaitanya Mahaprabhu. In the Gaudiya Vaishnava tradition, a six-word verse from the Kali-Saṇṭāraṇa Upaniṣad, which is considered the maha-mantra, or great mantra, of Krishna bhakti. The chanting of this maha-mantra is known as hari-nama sankirtana.

Hare Krishna, Hare Krishna, Krishna Krishna, Hare Hare
Hare Rama, Hare Rama, Rama Rama, Hare Hare.

Bhaktivedanta Swami initially had no support or acquaintances in the United States except the Agarwals, an Indian-American family, who, although strangers to him, had agreed to sponsor his visa. After reaching New York, he travelled to Butler, Pennsylvania to meet with the Agarwals. At Butler, he also delivered lectures to different groups at venues such as local YMCA. After a month, he returned to New York City where he moved between several humble living spaces, from windowless room to a loft in the Bowery. With the help of a few early followers, he found a stable place on the Lower East Side, where he turned a small store-front curiosity shop at 26 Second Avenue named "Matchless Gifts" into a small temple. he offered classes on the Bhagavad-gita and other Vaishnava texts and held kirtan (group chanting) of the Hare Krishna mantra.

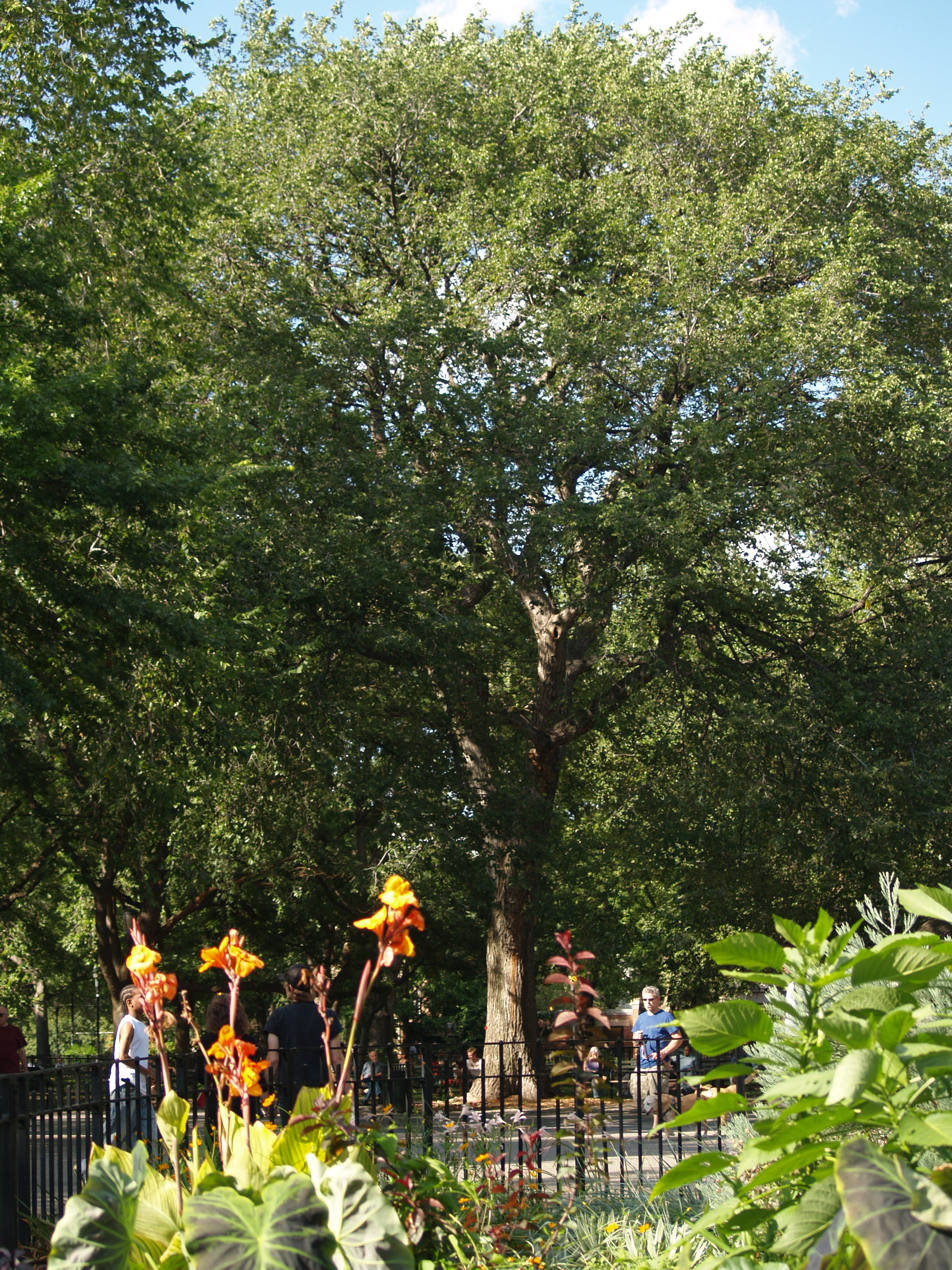
The Hare Krishna Tree in Tompkins Square Park, New York City

After he and his followers held a Hare Krishna kirtan one Sunday under a tree in nearby Tompkins Square Park, amid the social and cultural upheavals of the 1960s, Bhaktivedanta Swami attracted a small but dedicated group of followers in New York City while advocating a disciplined devotional life rooted in Gaudiya Vaishnavan teachings, introducing them to a spiritual framework centred on daily chanting of the Hare Krishna mantra, and advocating adherence to "four regulative principles". (Note: Contrasting with the countercultural lifestyle prevailing in the 1960s in the Western world, he required his followers had to vow to follow four "regulative principles": no illicit sex (that is, sex outside of marriage), no eating of meat, fish, or eggs, no intoxicants (including drugs, alcohol, cigarettes, and even coffee and tea), and no gambling in order to receive spiritual initiation (diksha) from him.) In 1966, he released the album entitled Krishna Consciousness, which helped introduce his teachings to a wider audience and fostered the spread of "Hare Krishna movement". Alongside these efforts, he oversaw the publication and promotion of key religious texts, including Bhagavad-Gītā As It Is, and encouraged his disciples to spread Krishna devotion through public chanting of the Hare Krishna mantra, literature distribution, food offerings, and preaching.

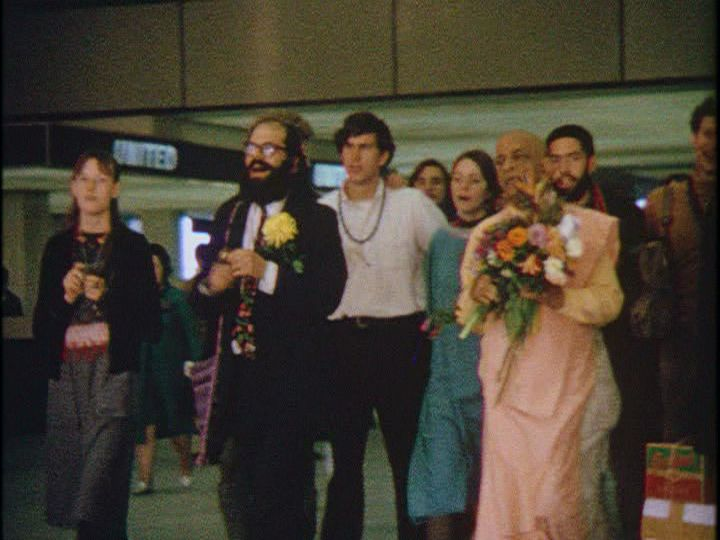
Bhaktivedanta Swami's arrival at San Francisco Airport and being greeted by Allen Ginsberg

In 1967, Bhaktivedanta Swami established a second ISKCON centre in San Francisco. Situated in the Haight–Ashbury district, then a focal point of the American counterculture, the temple attracted a growing number of followers and marked a significant phase in the movement's early development. That same year, the Mantra Rock Dance, a public event combining kirtan with performances by prominent rock musicians, drew thousands of attendees and helped introduce the Hare Krishna movement to a wider audience.

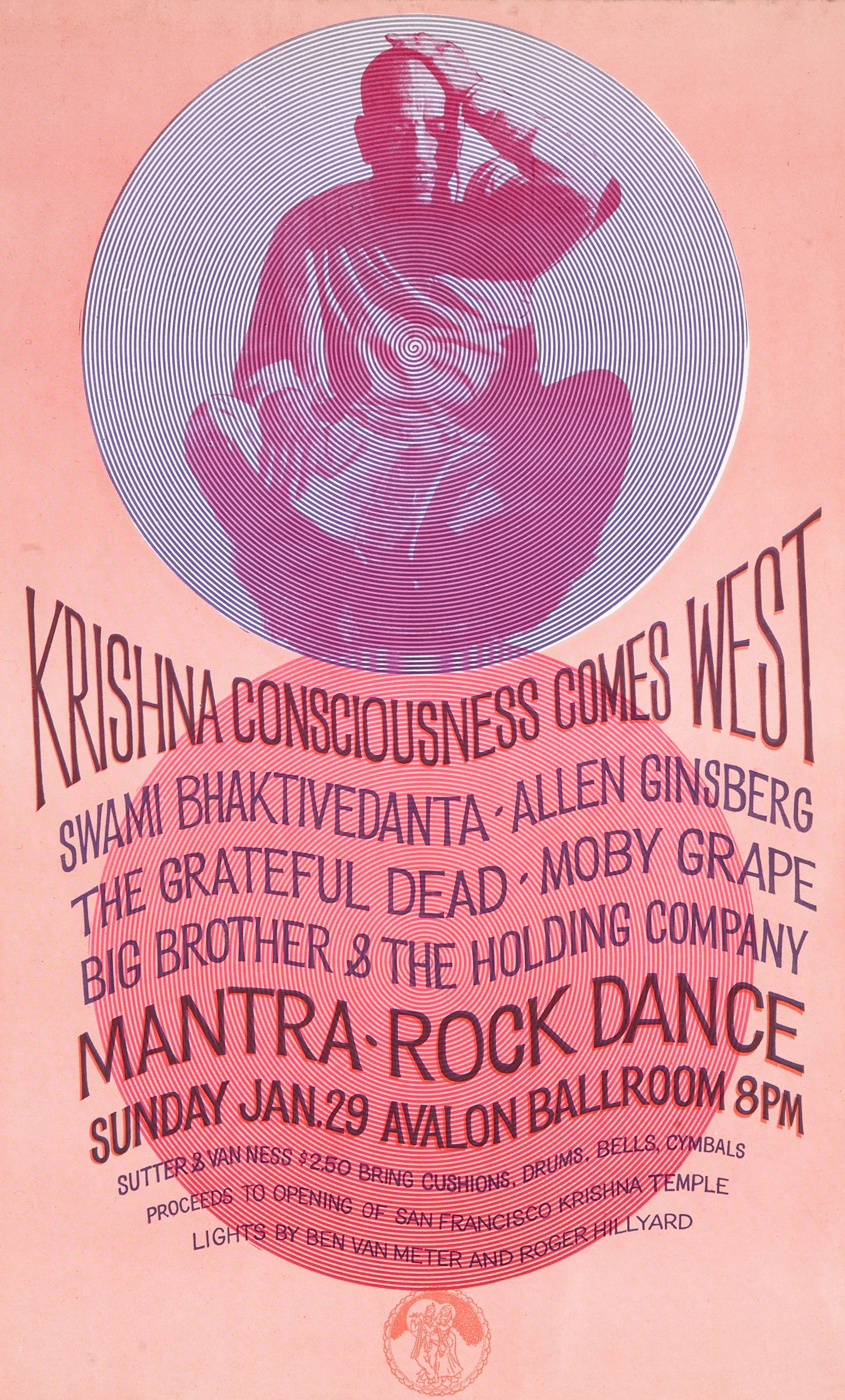
Poster of Mantra-Rock Dance musical event by Harvey W. Cohen

A major breakthrough came in December 1968, when the maha-mantra gained the attention of George Harrison and John Lennon of the Beatles after having met with the Swami's disciples. Eventually, Harrison produced a 1969 recording of the mantra by devotees from the London Radha Krishna Temple. Titled "Hare Krishna Mantra", the song reached the top twenty on the UK music charts and was also successful in West Germany and Czechoslovakia. The mantra of the Upanishad thus helped bring Bhaktivedanta and ISKCON ideas about Krishna to the West.

=== Southeast Asia ===
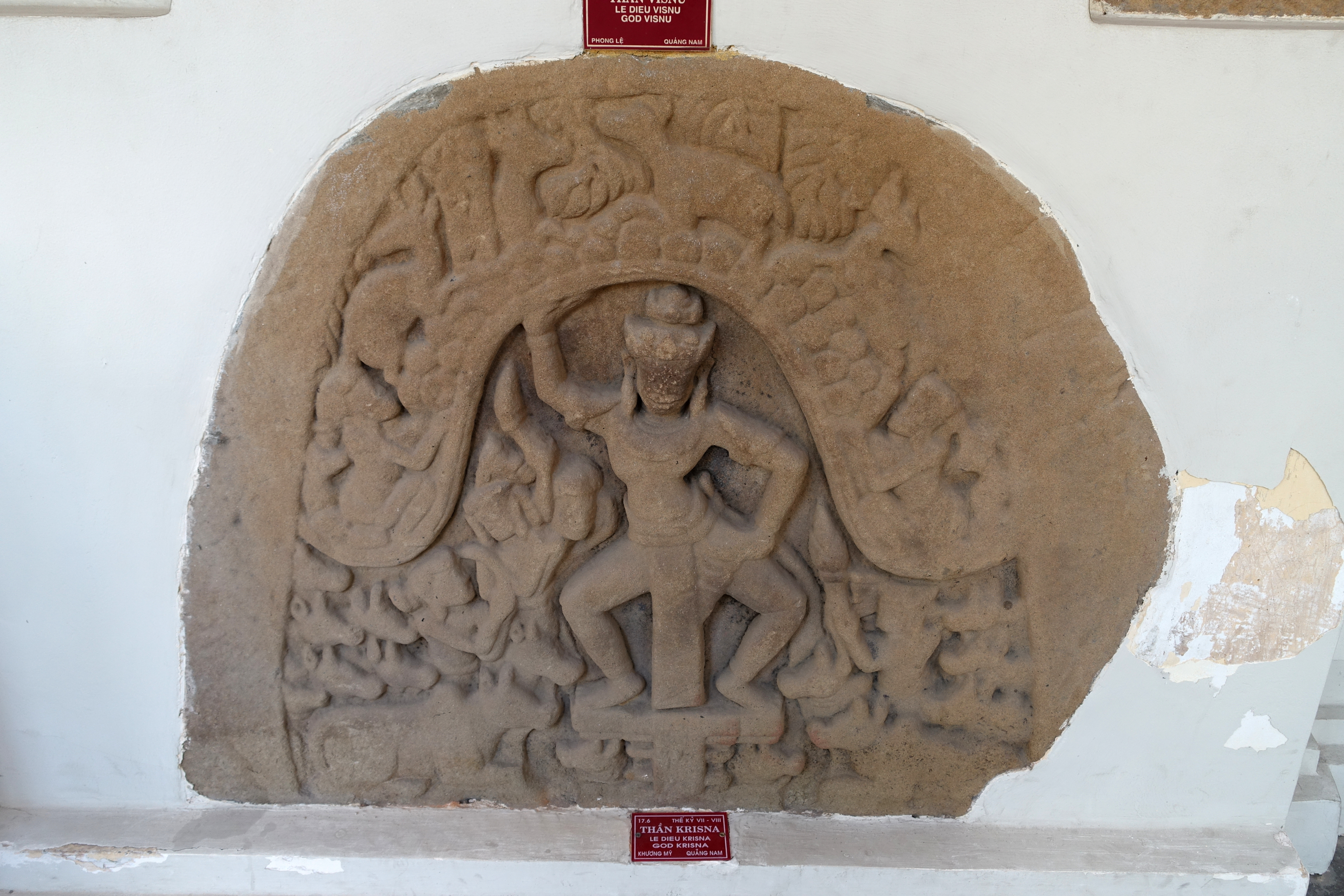
Krishna lifting the "Govardhan" mountain, a 7th-century artwork from an archaeological site in Da Nang, Vietnam

Krishna is found in Southeast Asian history and art, but to a far lesser extent than Shiva, Durga, Nandi, Agastya, and Buddha. In temples (candi) of the archaeological sites in hilly volcanic Java, Indonesia, temple reliefs do not portray his pastoral life or his role as the erotic lover, nor do the historic Javanese Hindu texts. Rather, either his childhood or his life as a king and Arjuna's companion have been more favored. The most elaborate temple arts of Krishna are found in a series of Krsnayana reliefs in the Prambanan Hindu temple complex near Yogyakarta. These are dated to the 9th century CE. Krishna remained a part of the Javanese cultural and theological fabric through the 14th century, as evidenced by the 14th-century Penataran reliefs, along with those of the Hindu god Rama in east Java, before Islam replaced Buddhism and Hinduism on the island.

The medieval-era arts of Vietnam and Cambodia feature Krishna. The earliest surviving sculptures and reliefs are from the 6th and 7th centuries, and these include Vaishnavism iconography. According to John Guy, the curator and director of Southeast Asian arts at the Metropolitan Museum of Art, the Krishna Govardhana art from 6th/7th-century Vietnam at Danang, and 7th-century Cambodia at Phnom Da cave in Angkor Borei, are some of the most sophisticated of this era.

Krishna's iconography has also been found in Thailand, along with those of Surya and Vishnu. For example, a large number of sculptures and icons have been found in the Si Thep and Klangnai sites in the Phetchabun region of northern Thailand. These are dated to about the 7th and 8th centuries, from both the Funan- and Zhenla-period archaeological sites.

== Sacred sites and temples ==
The pilgrimage sites associated with Krishna, such as at Mathura and Vrindavan, are visited by millions of devotees. (Note: The center of Krishna-worship has been for a long time Brajbhumi, the district of Mathura that embraces also Vrindavana, Govardhana, and Gokula, associated with Krishna from the time immemorial. Millions of Krishna bhaktas visit these places every year and participate in the numerous festivals that re-enact divine scenes from Krishna's life on Earth, of which were spent in those very places) By the late fifteenth century, many temples had been built in Vrindavan at sites associated with puranic stories about Krishna. Regional variations in the iconography of Krishna are seen in his different forms, such as Jagannatha in Odisha, Vithoba in Maharashtra, Shrinathji in Rajasthan, and Guruvayoorappan in Kerala. The popular Jagannath temple in Puri, Odisha, has been particularly significant within the tradition since about 800 CE, with Jagannath worshipped as a regional form associated with Krishna, along with Baladeva and Subhadra. South Indian states—such as Tamil Nadu, Karnataka, Andhra Pradesh, and Kerala—have many major Krishna temples, including Vithoba Temple and Guruvayur Temple, and Janmashtami is one of the widely celebrated festivals in South India. ISKCON has built Krishna temples in the West, as well as other locations such as South Africa.

=== Braj ===
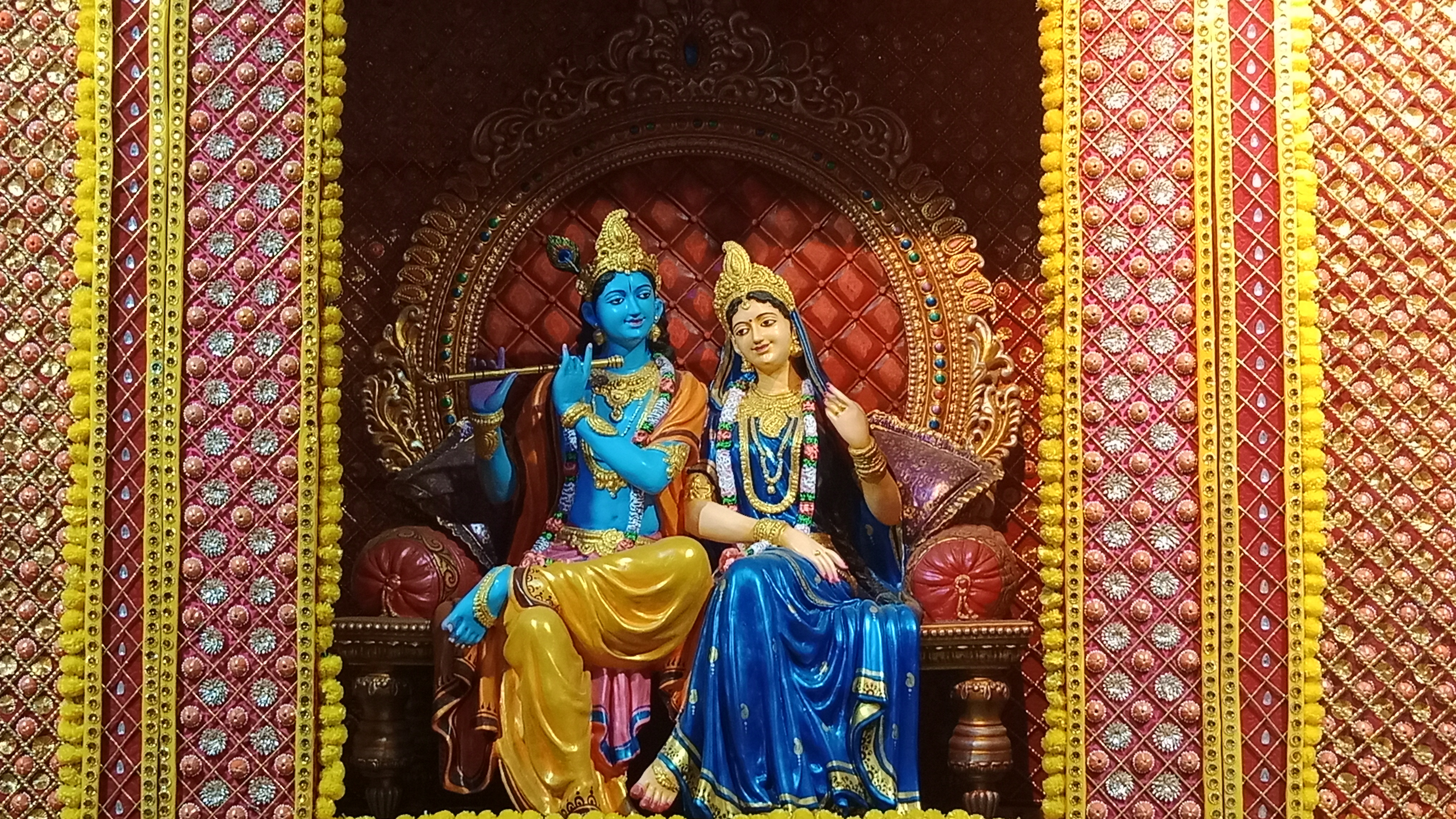
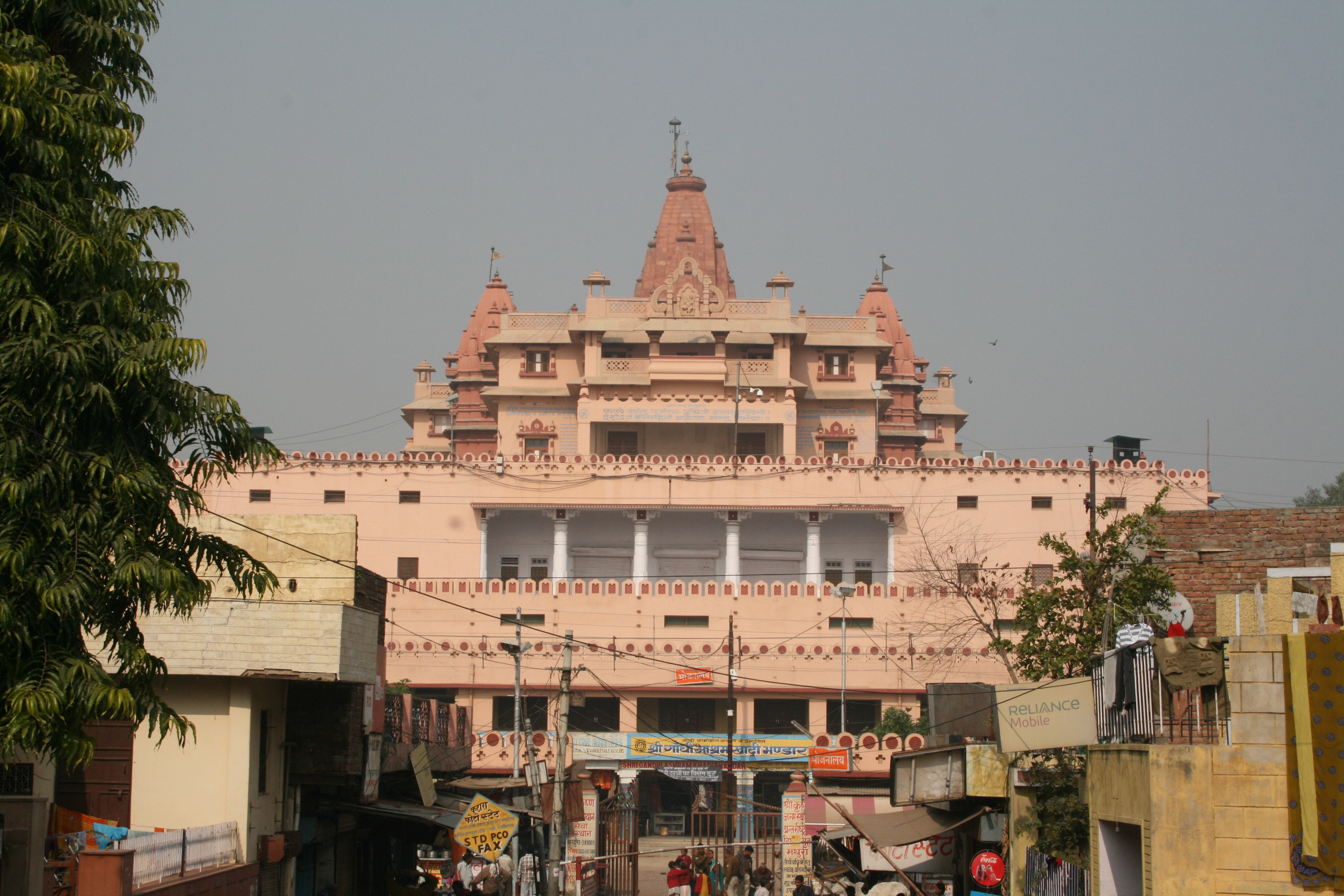
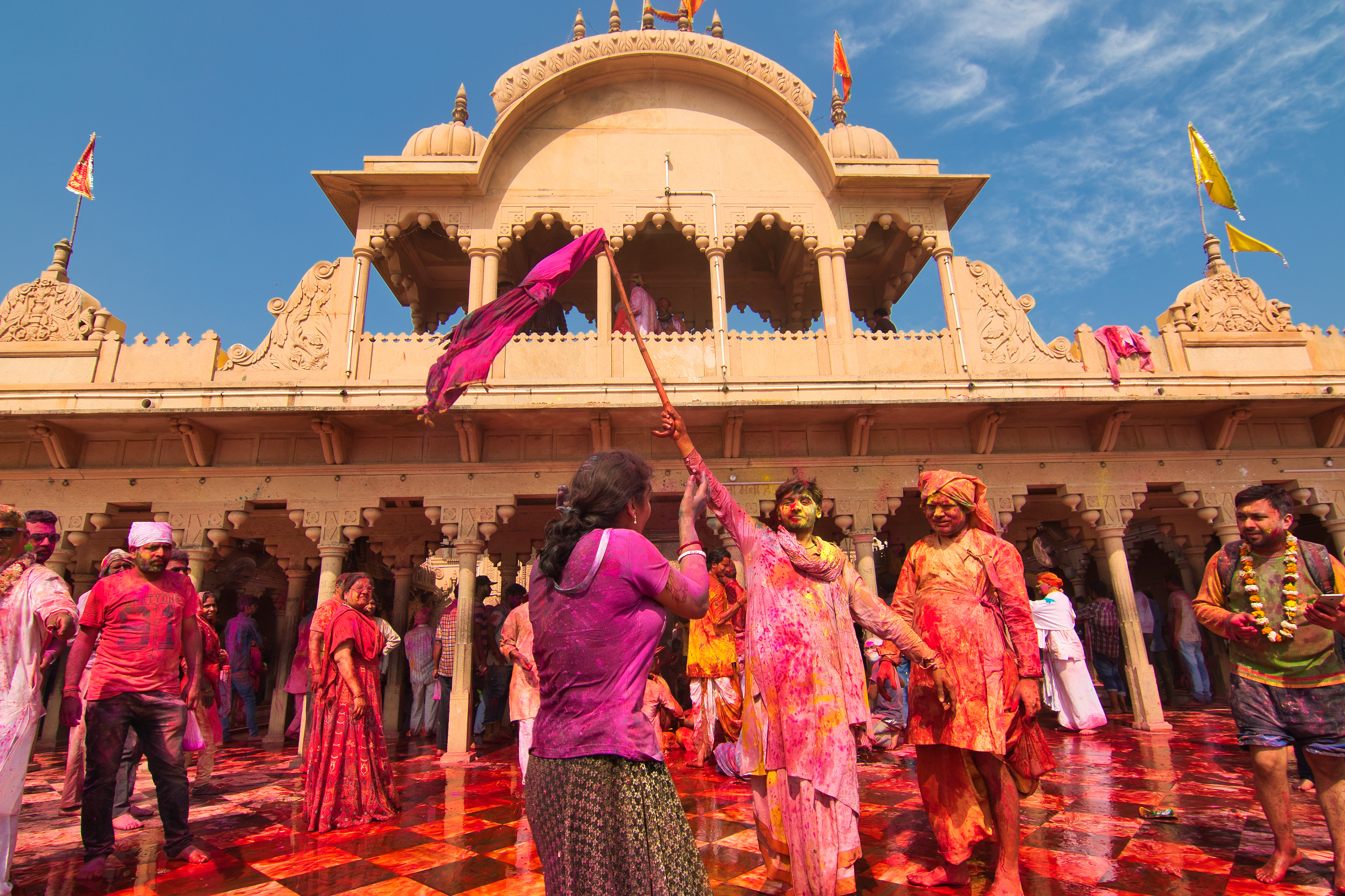
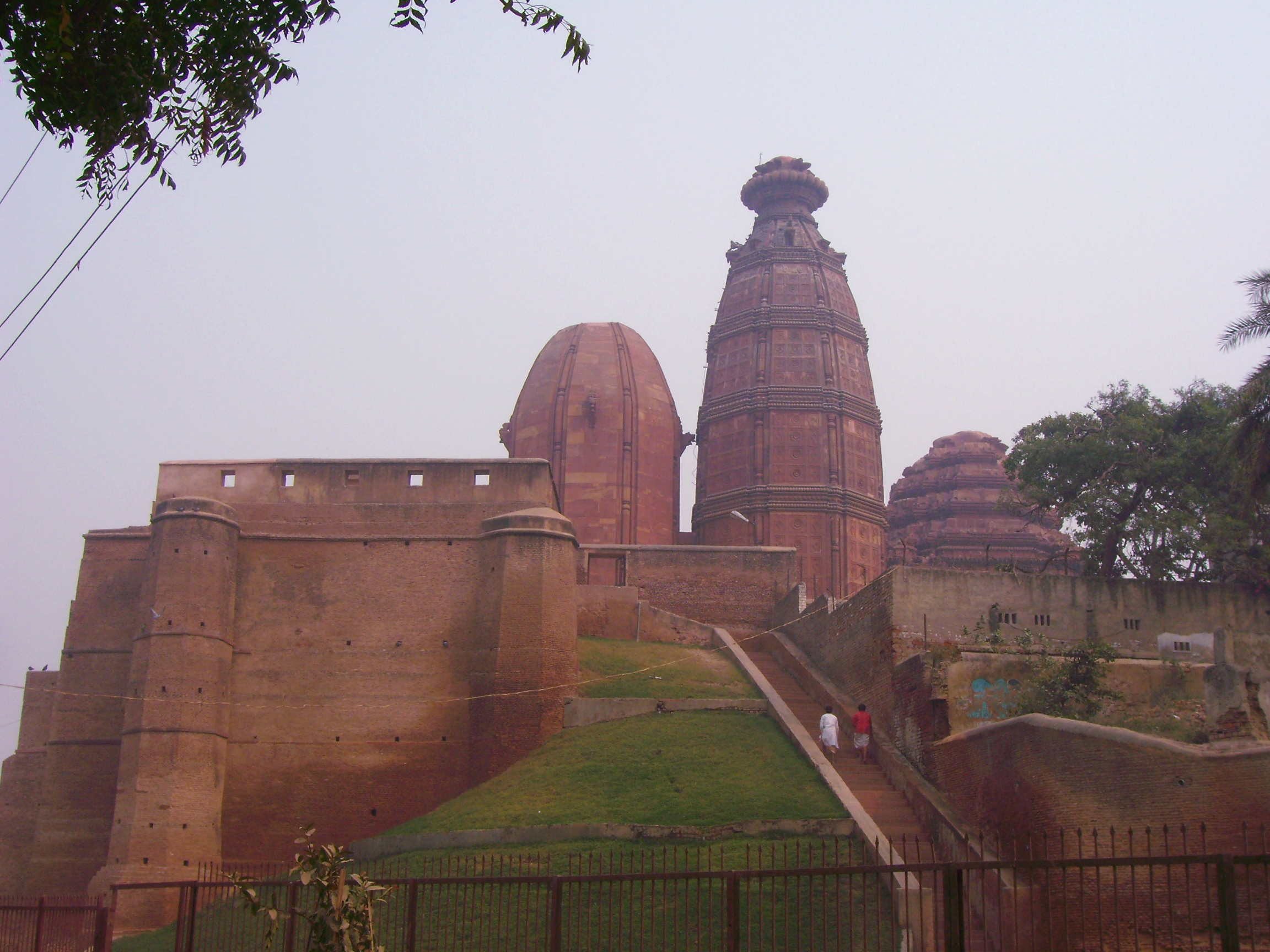
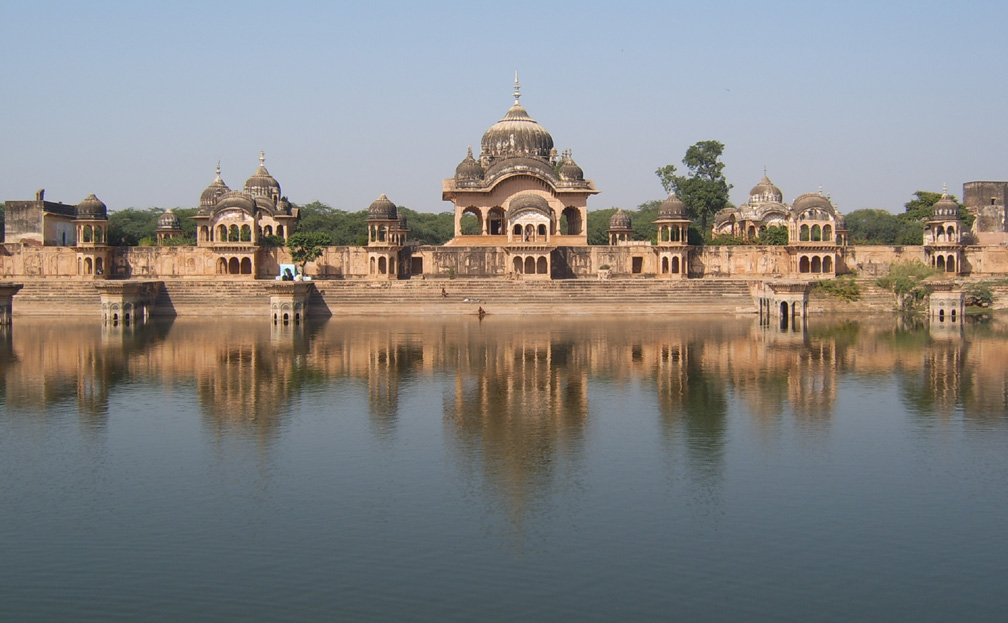
Zigzag from top-left: Radha Krishna at Kirti Temple, Barsana, Krishna Janmasthan in Mathura, Radha Rani Temple in Barsana, Radha Madan Mohan Temple, Vrindavan and Kusum Sarovar in Govardhan Hill.

Braj, also known as Vraja and Brijbhumi, is the birthplace of Krishna and Radha. The word is derived from the Sanskrit word vraja, which was used in oldest accounts on Krishna's childhood to mean "station of herdmen". Braj was never an official name for a territory, so it was not defined by enclosed boundaries. In modern days, Braj is a region on both sides of the Yamuna river with its centre in the Mathura district. It includes districts of Haryana and Uttar Pradesh as well as some areas of Rajasthan and Madhya Pradesh. The region occupies a central place in traditions associated with Krishna because it is believed to preserve the landscapes of his childhood, youth, and of his divine play, and thus is considered as a sacred pilgrimage site in Hinduism. Within Hindu sacred geography, Braj is regarded as the devotional landscape that holds the spatial and cultural memory of Krishna's earthy lilas (divine activities) with his associates. Every year million of devotees visits Mathura, Vrindavan, and neighbouring places. The region received 7.9 crore (79 million) devotees in the year 2023. Especially during Janmashtami, the region receives footfall of over 5 million devotees in one day.

==== Mathura ====
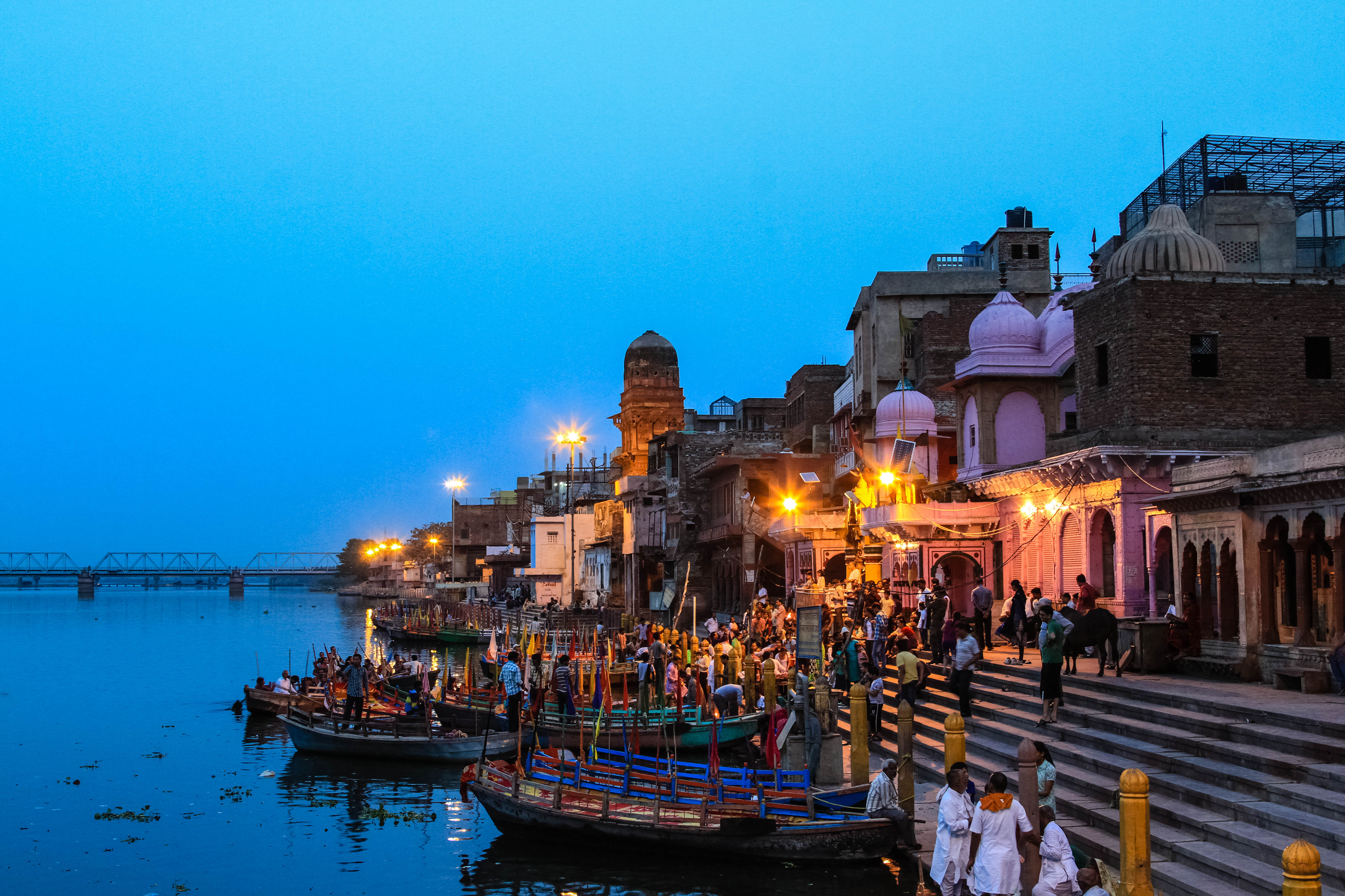
Vishram Ghat at Mathura across the Yamuna where Krishna rested after killing Kamsa

Mathura, believed to be the birthplace of Krishna, is located in the heart of the Braj region. Mathura is considered a teerth stahl (pilgrimage site) alongside neighbour cities, due to its religious importance. It is one of the Sapta Puri, the seven cities considered sacred by Hindus, also called the Mokshyadayni Tirth. The original temple built on the site of Krishna's birthplace (an underground prison) is replaced by the Krishna Janmasthan Temple Complex due to the original's destruction by Mughal rulers in the medieval era. The temple complex includes an important group of temples: Keshav Deva temple, Garbha Griha shrine, Bhagavata Bhavan and the Rangabhoomi where the final battle between Krishna and Kamsa took place. Many other places in Mathura are associated with divine activities of Krishna and are visited by devotees, as part of a pilgrimage. In ancient India, Kamsa ruled over Mathura and neighbouring cities, Vrindavan and Barsana, as part of the Vrishni kingdom. The Dwarkadheesh Temple is one of the largest temples in Mathura. Vishram Ghat at the bank of river Yamuna is said to be the place were Krishna rested after killing Kamsa. Other notable Hindu religious sites and heritage locations includes the Gita Mandir, Govind Dev temple, ISKCON temple, Kusum Sarovar, Naam yog Sadhna Mandir, Peepleshwar Mahadeo Temple, and Yum Yamuna Temple.

=== Vrindavan ===
Vrindavan (IAST: Vṛndāvana), considered a twin-city to Mathura, is an historical city in the Mathura district of Uttar Pradesh, India. It is a pivotal part of the Braj region as it has religious importance and is considered holy in the Hinduism, because it is believed that Krishna spent most of his childhood in this city and thus preserves memories of him and has cultural significance. Vrindavan has about 5,500 temples dedicated to the worship of Krishna and his chief consort, Radha.

== Performance arts ==
=== Dance and culture ===
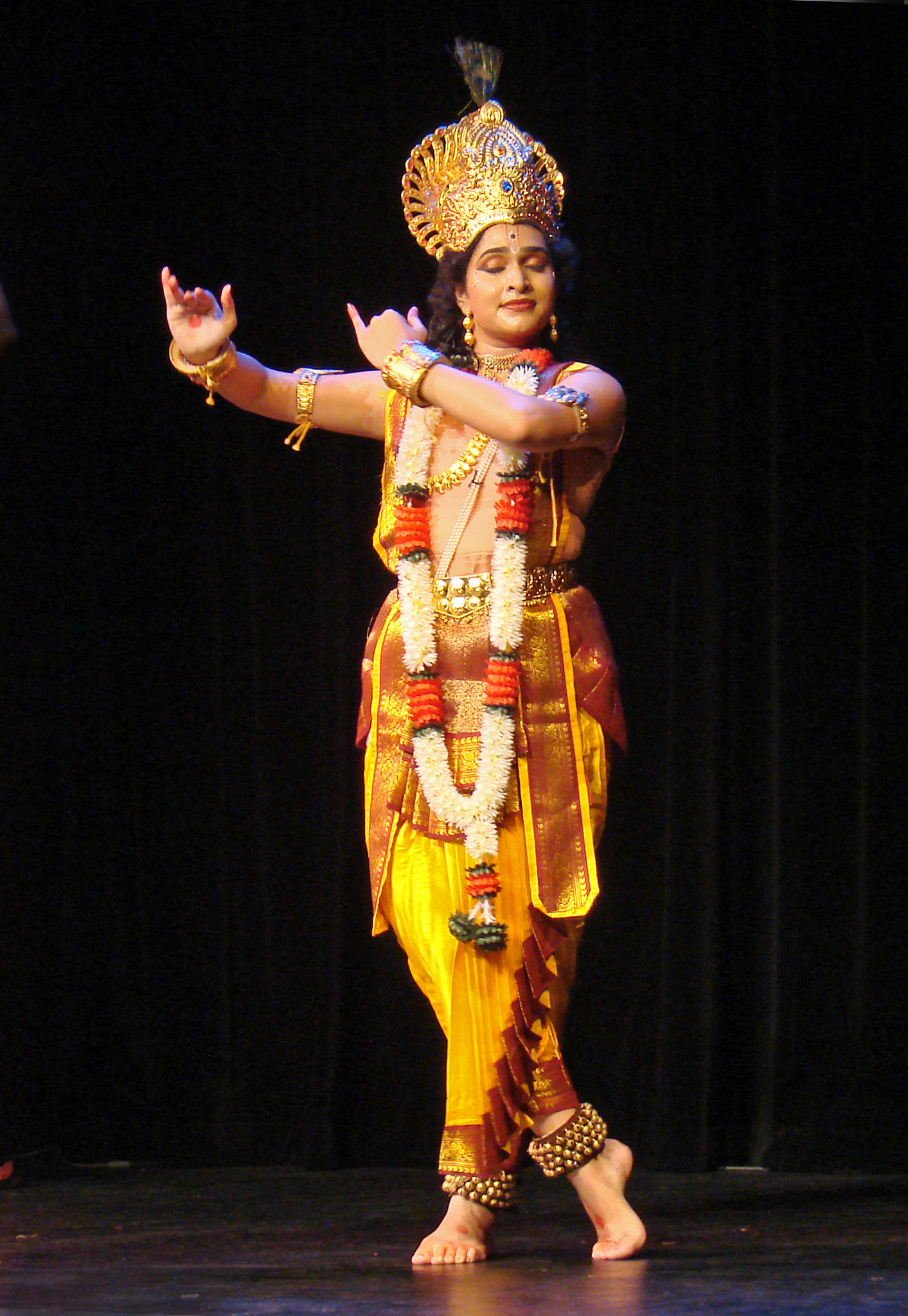
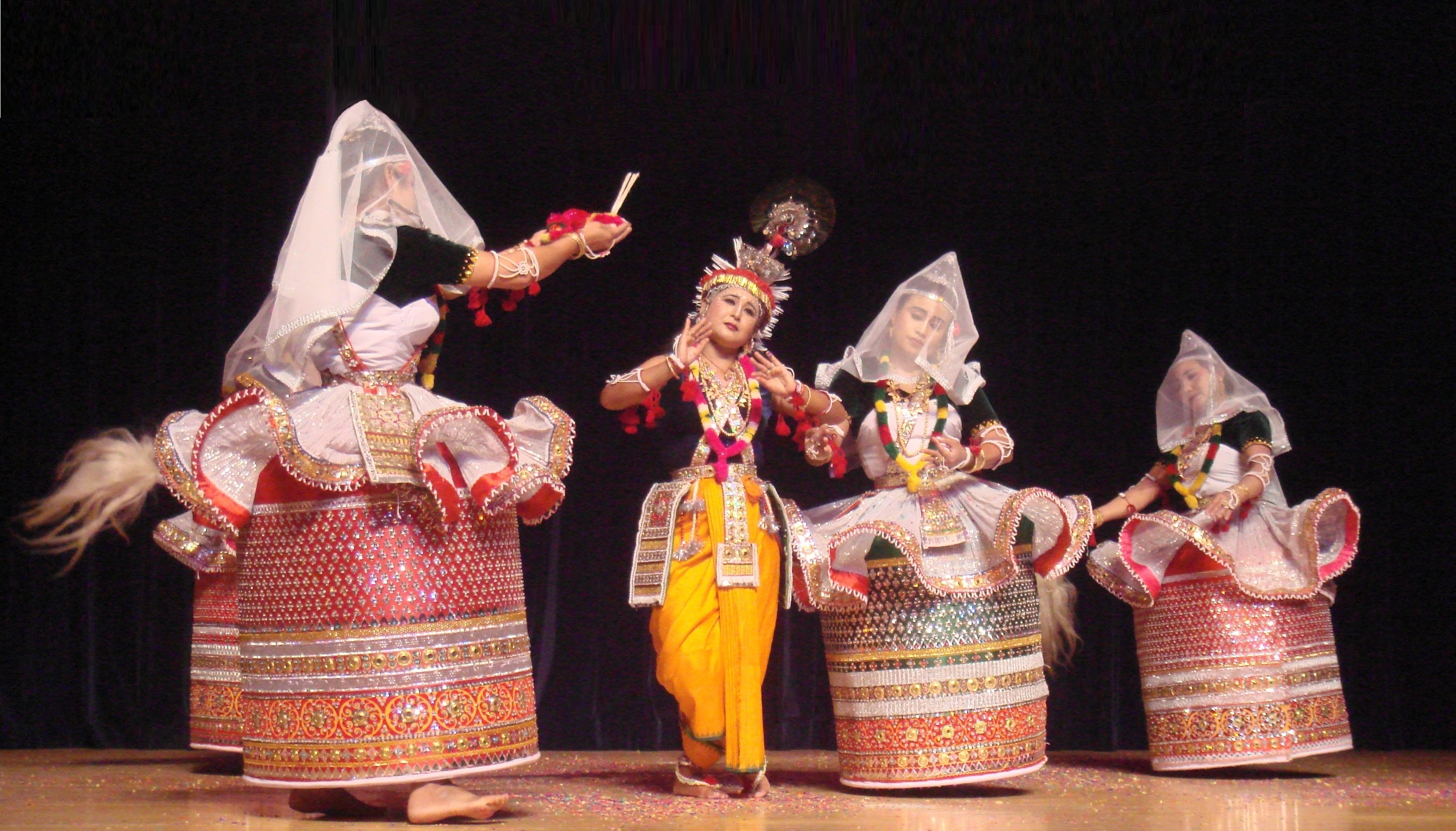
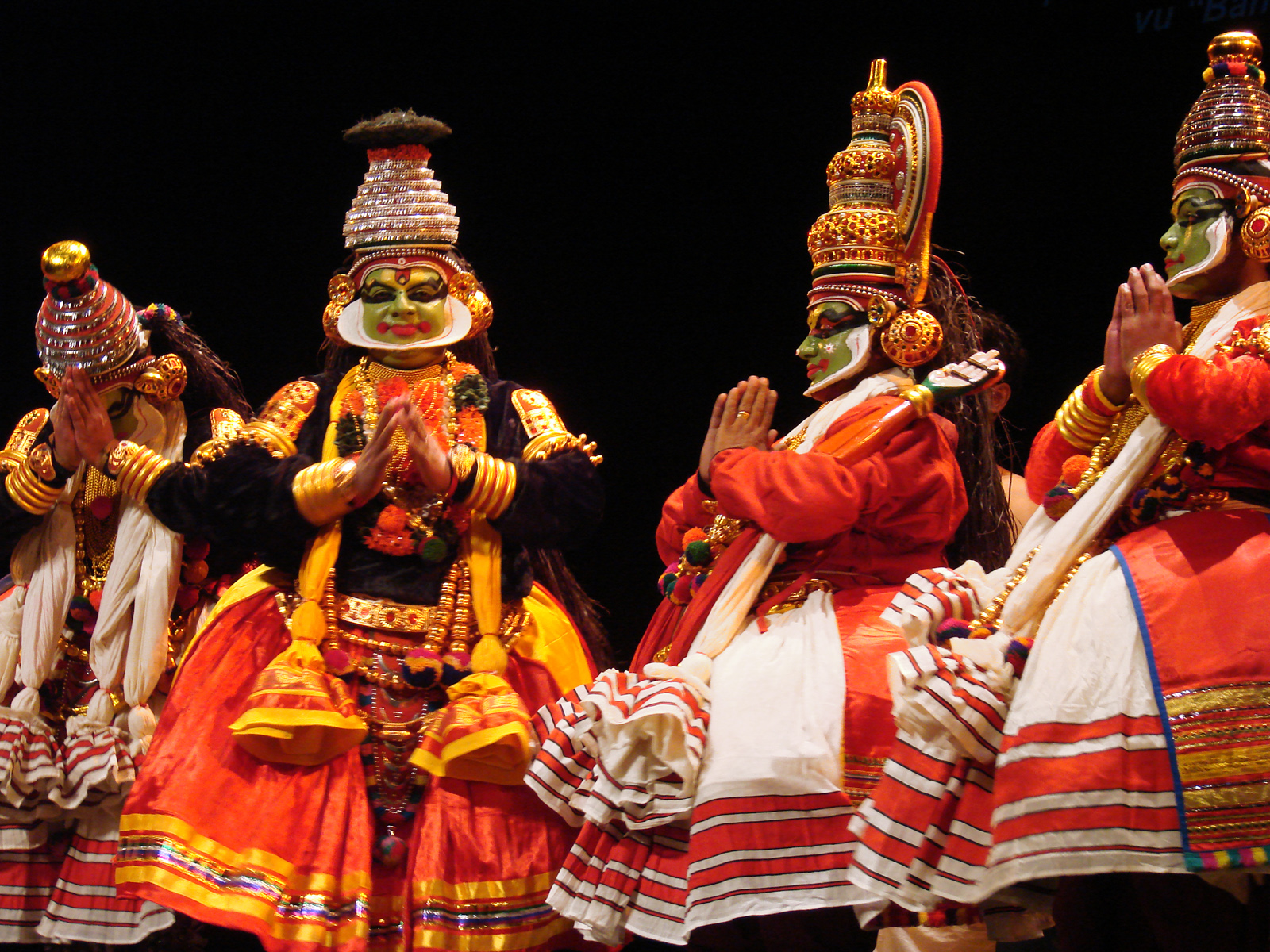
The Krishna legends in the Bhagavata Purana have inspired many performance arts repertoire, such as Kathak, Kuchipudi (left), Odissi and Krishnanattam (right). The Rasa Lila where Krishna plays with the gopis in Manipuri dance style (center)

Indian dance and music theatre traces its origins and techniques to the ancient Sama Veda and Natyasastra texts. The stories enacted and the numerous choreographic themes are inspired by the legends in Hindu texts, including Krishna-related literature such as Harivamsa and Bhagavata Purana.

The Krishna stories have played a key role in the history of Indian theatre, music, and dance, particularly through the tradition of the Rasalila (Ras dance). These are dramatic enactments of Krishna's childhood, adolescence, and adulthood. One common scene involves Krishna playing flute in the Rasalila, only to be heard by certain gopis (cowherd maidens), which is theologically supposed to represent a divine call only heard by certain enlightened beings. Some of the text's legends have inspired secondary theatre literature such as the eroticism in the Gita Govinda.

Krishna-related literature, such as the Bhagavata Purana, accords a metaphysical significance to the performances and treats them as a religious ritual, infusing daily life with spiritual meaning, thus representing a good, honest, happy life. Similarly, Krishna-inspired performances aim to cleanse the hearts of faithful actors and listeners. Singing, dancing, and performing any part of Krishna Lila is an act of remembering the dharma in the text, as a form of para bhakti (supreme devotion). To remember Krishna at any time and in any art, asserts the text, is to worship the good and the divine.

Classical dance styles such as Kathak, Odissi, Manipuri, Kuchipudi, and Bharatanatyam in particular are known for their Krishna-related performances. Krisnattam (Krishnattam) traces its origins to Krishna legends, and is linked to another major classical Indian dance form, called Kathakali. Bryant summarizes the influence of Krishna stories in the Bhagavata Purana as, "[it] has inspired more derivative literature, poetry, drama, dance, theatre and art than any other text in the history of Sanskrit literature, with the possible exception of the Ramayana.

The Palliyodam, a type of large boat built and used by Aranmula Parthasarathy Temple, in Kerala, for the annual water processions of Uthrattathi Jalamela and Valla Sadhya has the legend that it was designed by Krishna and was made to look like Sheshanaga, the serpent on which Vishnu rests.

=== In popular culture ===
Krishna has been depicted in several television series and films in multiple languages across India. Many Hindu texts have been adapted into video series, with Krishna as a main character or in a key supporting role. Krishna-related films include the Bengali film Radha Krishna (1933), the Telugu-Tamil film Mayabazar (1957), and the Hindi animated film Krishna Aur Kans (2012). Krishna has been portrayed in several Television series, including B. R. Chopra's Mahabharat (1988), Ramanand Sagar's Shri Krishna (1993), Jai Shri Krishna (2008), Mahabharat (2013), RadhaKrishn (2018), and Shrimad Bhagwat Mahapuran (2019).

== Outside Hinduism ==
=== Jainism ===
The Jainism tradition lists 63 Śalākāpuruṣa or notable figures, which, amongst others, include the twenty-four Tirthankaras (spiritual teachers) and nine sets of triads. In every half time cycle, according to Jain cosmology, there are nine sets of Balabhadra (gentle heroes), Vasudevas (violent heroes), and Prativāsudevas (anti-heroes) each set known as a triad. One of these sets is Krishna as the Vasudeva, Balarama as the Balabhadra, and Jarasandha as the Prativāsudeva. In each age of the Jain cyclic, a Vasudeva (violent hero) is born with an elder brother termed as the Baladeva (gentle hero). Between the triads, the Baladeva upholds the principle of non-violence, a central idea in Jainism. The villain is the Prati-vasudeva, who attempts to destroy the world. To save the world, Vasudeva-Krishna has to forsake the non-violence principle and kill the Prati-Vasudeva. The stories of these triads can be found in the Harivamsa Purana (c. 8th century CE ) of Jinasena (not be confused with its namesake, the addendum to Mahābhārata) and the Trishashti-shalakapurusha-charita of Hemachandra.

The story of Krishna's life depicted in the Puranas of Jainism follows the same general outline as those in the Hindu texts, but they are different in certain details: the Jain texts include Tirthankaras as figures in the story, and generally are polemically critical of Krishna, unlike the versions found in the Mahabharata, the Bhagavata Purana, and the Vishnu Purana. For example, Krishna loses battles in the Jain versions, and his gopis and his clan of Yadavas die in a fire created by an ascetic named Dvaipayana. Similarly, after dying from the hunter Jara's arrow, the Jain texts state that Krishna goes to the third hell in Jain cosmology, while his brother is said to go to the sixth heaven.

Vimalasuri is attributed to be the author of the Jain version of the Harivamsa Purana, but no manuscripts have been found that confirm this. It is likely that later Jain scholars, probably Jinasena of the 8th century, wrote a complete version of Krishna legends in the Jain tradition and credited it to the ancient Vimalasuri. Partial and older versions of the Krishna story are available in Jain literature, such as in the Antagata Dasao of the Svetambara Agama tradition.

In other Jain texts, Krishna is stated to be a cousin of the twenty-second Tirthankara, Neminatha. The Jain texts state that Neminatha taught Krishna all the wisdom that he later gave to Arjuna in the Bhagavad Gita. According to Jeffery D. Long, this connection between Krishna and Neminatha has been a historic reason for Jains to accept, read, and cite the Bhagavad Gita as a spiritually important text, celebrate Krishna-related festivals, and intermingle with Hindus as spiritual cousins.

=== Buddhism ===
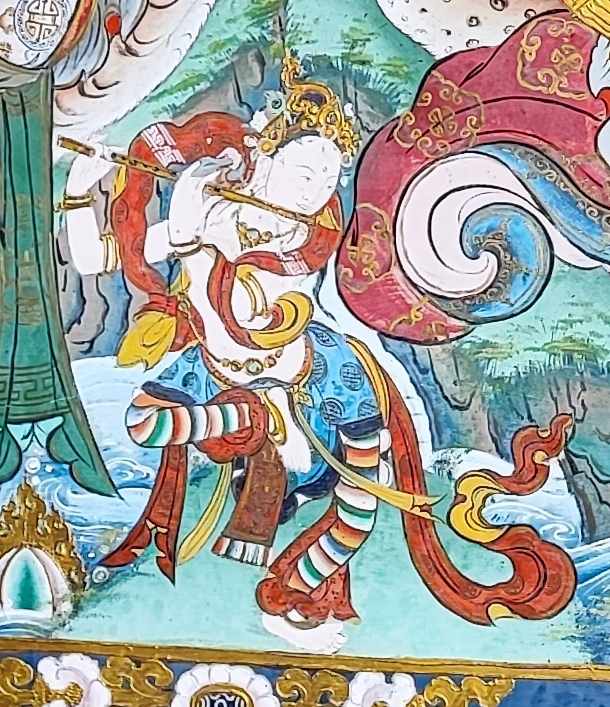
Depiction of Krishna playing the flute, mural of Bhutia Busty Monastery, Darjeeling district, India

The story of Krishna occurs in the Jataka tales in Buddhism. The Vidhurapandita Jataka mentions Madhura (Sanskrit: Mathura), the Ghata Jataka mentions Kamsa, Devagabbha (Sanskrit: Devaki), Upasagara or Vasudeva, Govaddhana (Sanskrit: Govardhana), Baladeva (Balarama), and Kanha or Kesava (Sanskrit: Krishna, Keshava).

Like the Jain versions of the Krishna legends, the Buddhist versions, such as one in Ghata Jataka, follow the general outline of the Hindu story, but are different in certain respects, as well. For example, the Buddhist legend describes Devagabbha (Devaki) to have been isolated in a palace built upon a pole after she is born, so no future husband could reach her. Krishna's father similarly is described as a powerful king, but who meets up with Devagabbha anyway, and to whom Kamsa gives away his sister Devagabbha in marriage. The siblings of Krishna are not killed by Kamsa, though Kamsa tries. In the Buddhist version of the legend, all of Krishna's siblings grow to maturity.

Krishna and his siblings' capital becomes Dvaravati. The Arjuna and Krishna interaction is missing in the Jataka version. A new legend is included, wherein Krishna uncontrollably laments his son's death, and a Ghatapandita feigns madness to teach Krishna a lesson. The Jataka tale also includes internecine destruction among Krishna's siblings after they all get drunk. Krishna also dies in the Buddhist legend by the hand of a hunter named Jara, but while he is traveling to a frontier city. Mistaking Krishna for a pig, Jara throws a spear that fatally pierces Krishna's feet, causing Krishna great pain and then his death.

At the end of this Ghata-Jataka discourse, the Buddhist text declares that Sariputta, one of the revered disciples of the Buddha in the Buddhist tradition, was incarnated as Krishna in his previous life to learn lessons on grief from the Buddha in his prior rebirth:

Then he [Master] declared the Truths and identified the Birth: "At that time, Ananda was Rohineyya, Sariputta was Vasudeva [Krishna], the followers of the Buddha were the other persons, and I myself was Ghatapandita."

— Jataka Tale No. 454, Translator: W. H. D. Rouse

While the Buddhist Jataka texts co-opt Krishna-Vasudeva and make him a student of the Buddha in his previous life, the Hindu texts co-opt the Buddha and make him an avatar of Vishnu. In Chinese Buddhism, Taoism, and Chinese folk religion, the figure of Krishna has been amalgamated with that of Nalakuvara to influence the formation of the god Nezha, who has taken on iconographic characteristics of Krishna, such as being presented as a divine god-child and slaying a nāga in his youth.

=== Other ===
Krishna's life is written about in "Krishna Avtar" of the Chaubis Avtar, a composition in Dasam Granth traditionally and historically attributed to the Sikh Guru Gobind Singh. Within the Sikh-derived 19th-century Radha Soami movement, the followers of its founder, Shiv Dayal Singh, used to consider him the Living Master and incarnation of God (Krishna/Vishnu). (Note: "Various branches of Radhasoami have argued about the incarnationalism of Satguru (Lane, 1981). Guru Maharaj Ji has accepted it and identifies with Krishna and other incarnations of Vishnu.")

Baháʼís believe that Krishna was a "Manifestation of God", or one in a line of prophets who have revealed the Word of God progressively for a gradually maturing humanity. In this way, Krishna shares an exalted station with Abraham, Moses, Zoroaster, Buddha, Jesus, Muhammad, the Báb, and the founder of the Baháʼí Faith, Bahá'u'lláh.

Ahmadiyya, a 20th-century Islamic movement, consider Krishna as one of their ancient prophets. Their founder, Mirza Ghulam Ahmad, stated that he was himself a prophet, in the likeness of prophets such as Krishna, Jesus, and Muhammad, who had come to earth as a latter-day reviver of religion and morality. He also claimed to be Krishna himself.

Krishna worship or reverence has been adopted by several new religious movements since the 19th century, and he is sometimes a member of an eclectic pantheon in occult texts, along with Greek, Buddhist, biblical, and even historical figures. For instance, Édouard Schuré, an influential figure in perennial philosophy and occult movements, considered Krishna a Great Initiate, while Theosophists regard Krishna as an incarnation of Maitreya (one of the Masters of the Ancient Wisdom), the most important spiritual teacher for humanity along with Buddha.

Krishna was canonised by Aleister Crowley and is recognised as a saint of Ecclesia Gnostica Catholica in the Gnostic Mass of Ordo Templi Orientis.

== See also ==
- Dvapara Yuga
- Kalki
- Krishnaism – Group of Hindu traditions that reveres Krishna as the Supreme Being

== Sources ==
- Archer, W. G. (2004) [1957 by Macmillan Company, NY]. The Loves of Krishna in Indian Painting and Poetry. Mineola, NY: Dover Publications. ISBN 0-486-43371-4.
- Beck, Guy L. (1993). Sonic Theology: Hinduism and Sacred Sound. Studies in Comparative Religion. Columbia, SC: University of South Carolina Press. ISBN 0872498557.
- Beck, Guy L., ed. (2005). Alternative Krishnas: Regional and Vernacular Variations on a Hindu Deity. Albany, NY: SUNY Press. ISBN 978-0-7914-6415-1.
- Brown, C. Mackenzie (1983). "The Origin and Transmission of the Two "Bhāgavata Purāṇas": A Canonical and Theological Dilemma". Journal of the American Academy of Religion. 51 (4): 551–567. doi:10.1093/jaarel/li.4.551. JSTOR 1462581.
- Bryant, Edwin F.; Ekstrand, Maria (2004). The Hare Krishna Movement: The Postcharismatic Fate of a Religious Transplant. New York: Columbia University Press. ISBN 978-0-231-50843-8.
- Bryant, Edwin F. (2003). Krishna: the beautiful legend of God: Srimad Bhagavata Purana. Penguin. ISBN 978-0-14-191337-7.
- Bryant, Edwin F. (2007). Krishna: A Sourcebook. Oxford University Press. ISBN 978-0-19-514891-6.
- Cort, J. E. (1993). Wendy Doniger (ed.). An Overview of the Jaina Puranas, in Purana Perennis. SUNY Press. ISBN 978-1-4384-0136-2.
- Entwistle, Alan W. (10 February 2025). Braj, Centre of Krishna Pilgrimage. BRILL. ISBN 978-90-04-64659-9.
- Eschmann, Anncharlott; Kulke, Hermann; Tripathi, Gaya Charan, eds. (1978) [Rev. ed. 2014]. The Cult of Jagannath and the regional tradition of Orissa. South Asian Studies, 8. New Delhi: Manohar. ISBN 978-8173046179.
- Flood, Galvin D. (1996). An Introduction to Hinduism. Cambridge University Press. ISBN 978-0-521-43878-0.
- Garuda Pillar of Besnagar, Archaeological Survey of India, Annual Report (1908–1909). Calcutta: Superintendent of Government Printing, 1912, 129.
- Goswami, Tamal Krishna (2012). Schweig, Graham M. (ed.). A Living Theology of Krishna Bhakti: Essential Teachings of A.C. Bhaktivedanta Swami Prabhupada. Oxford University Press. doi:10.1093/acprof:oso/9780199796632.001.0001. ISBN 978-0-1997-9663-2. LCCN 2011050785. OCLC 7335553355.
- Hardy, Friedhelm E. (1987). "Kṛṣṇaism". In Mircea Eliade (ed.). The Encyclopedia of Religion. Vol. 8. New York: MacMillan. pp. 387–392. ISBN 978-0-02897-135-3 – via Encyclopedia.com.
- Hawley, John Stratton (2020). Krishna's Playground: Vrindavan in the 21st Century. New York: Oxford University Press. ISBN 978-0190123987.
- Irwin, John (1974). "The Heliodorus Pillar at Besanagar". Purātattva. 8. Archaeological Society of India (co-published Art and Archaeology Research Papers, USA): 166–176.
- Khare, M. D. (1967). "Discovery of a Vishnu temple near the Heliodorus pillar, Besnagar, Dist. Vidisha (MP)". Lalit Kala. 13: 21–27. JSTOR 44138838.
- Klostermaier, Klaus K. (2007). A Survey of Hinduism (3rd ed.). Albany (N.Y.): State University of New York Press. ISBN 978-0-7914-7081-7.
- Knott, Kim (2000). Hinduism: A Very Short Introduction. Oxford University Press. ISBN 978-0-19-285387-5.
- Kumar Das, Sisir (2006). A history of Indian literature, 500–1399. Sahitya Akademi. ISBN 978-81-260-2171-0.
- Mani, Vettam (1975). Puranic encyclopaedia : a comprehensive dictionary with special reference to the epic and Puranic literature. Delhi: Motilal Banarsidass. ISBN 978-0-8426-0822-0.
- Marijke J. Klokke (2000). Narrative Sculpture and Literary Traditions in South and Southeast Asia. Brill. ISBN 978-90-04-11865-2.
- Matchett, Freda (2001). Kṛṣṇa, Lord or Avatāra?. Routledge. ISBN 978-0-7007-1281-6.
- Melton, J. Gordon (13 September 2011). Religious Celebrations: An Encyclopedia of Holidays, Festivals, Solemn Observances, and Spiritual Commemorations. ABC-CLIO. ISBN 978-1-59884-205-0.
- Miśra, Narayan (2005). Durga Nandan Mishra (ed.). Annals and Antiquities of the Temple of Jagannātha. New Delhi: Sarup & Sons. ISBN 81-7625-747-8.
- Preciado-Solís, Benjamín (1984). The Kṛṣṇa Cycle in the Purāṇas: Themes and Motifs in a Heroic Saga. Motilal Banarsidass. ISBN 978-0-89581-226-1.
- Ramnarace, Vijay (2014). Rādhā-Kṛṣṇa's Vedāntic Debut: Chronology & Rationalisation in the Nimbārka Sampradāya (PDF) (PhD thesis). University of Edinburgh. Archived (PDF) from the original on 9 October 2022.
- Raychaudhuri, Hemchandra (1972). Political History of Ancient India. Calcutta: University of Calcutta. Originally published in 1923
- Rocher, Ludo (1986). The Puranas. Otto Harrassowitz Verlag. ISBN 978-3-447-02522-5.
- Rosen, Steven (2006). Essential Hinduism. New York: Praeger. ISBN 978-0-275-99006-0.
- Schomer, Karine; McLeod, W. H., eds. (1987). The Sants: Studies in a Devotional Tradition of India. Motilal Banarsidass. ISBN 978-8120802773.
- Shah, Natubhai (2004) [1998]. Jainism: The World of Conquerors. Vol. I. Motilal Banarsidass. ISBN 978-81-208-1938-2.
- Sheridan, Daniel (1986). The Advaitic Theism of the Bhāgavata Purāṇa. Columbia, Mo: South Asia Books. ISBN 978-81-208-0179-0.
- Singh, Upinder (2016). A History of Ancient and Early Medieval India: From the Stone Age to the 12th Century. Pearson Education. ISBN 978-93-325-6996-6.
- Starza, O. M. (1993). The Jagannatha Temple at Puri: Its Architecture, Art and Cult. Studies in South Asian culture, 15. Leiden; New York; Köln: Brill. ISBN 90-04-09673-6.
- Susan V Mishra; Himanshu P Ray (2017). The Archaeology of Sacred Spaces. Routledge. ISBN 978-1-138-67920-7.
- The Jataka or Stories of the Buddha's Former Births, edited by E. B. Cowell, (1895)
- The Mahabharata of Krishna-Dwaipayana Vyasa, translated by Kisari Mohan Ganguli, published between 1883 and 1896
- The Vishnu-Purana, translated by H. H. Wilson, (1840)
- The Srimad Bhagavatam, translated by A.C. Bhaktivedanta Swami Prabhupada, (1988) copyright Bhaktivedanta Book Trust
- Toffin, Gérard (2012). "The Power of Boundaries: Transnational Links among Krishna Pranamis of India and Nepal". In John Zavos; et al. (eds.). Public Hinduisms. New Delhi: Sage Publ. India. pp. 249–254. ISBN 978-81-321-1696-7.
- Varadpande, Manohar Laxman (1987). History of Indian theatre. Abhinav Publications. ISBN 978-81-7017-221-5.
- Rochford, E. Burke (2007). Hare Krishna transformed. New York University Press. doi:10.1111/j.1748-0922.2007.00197_1.x. ISBN 978-0-8147-7578-3. Alt URL
