= Braj =

- Region
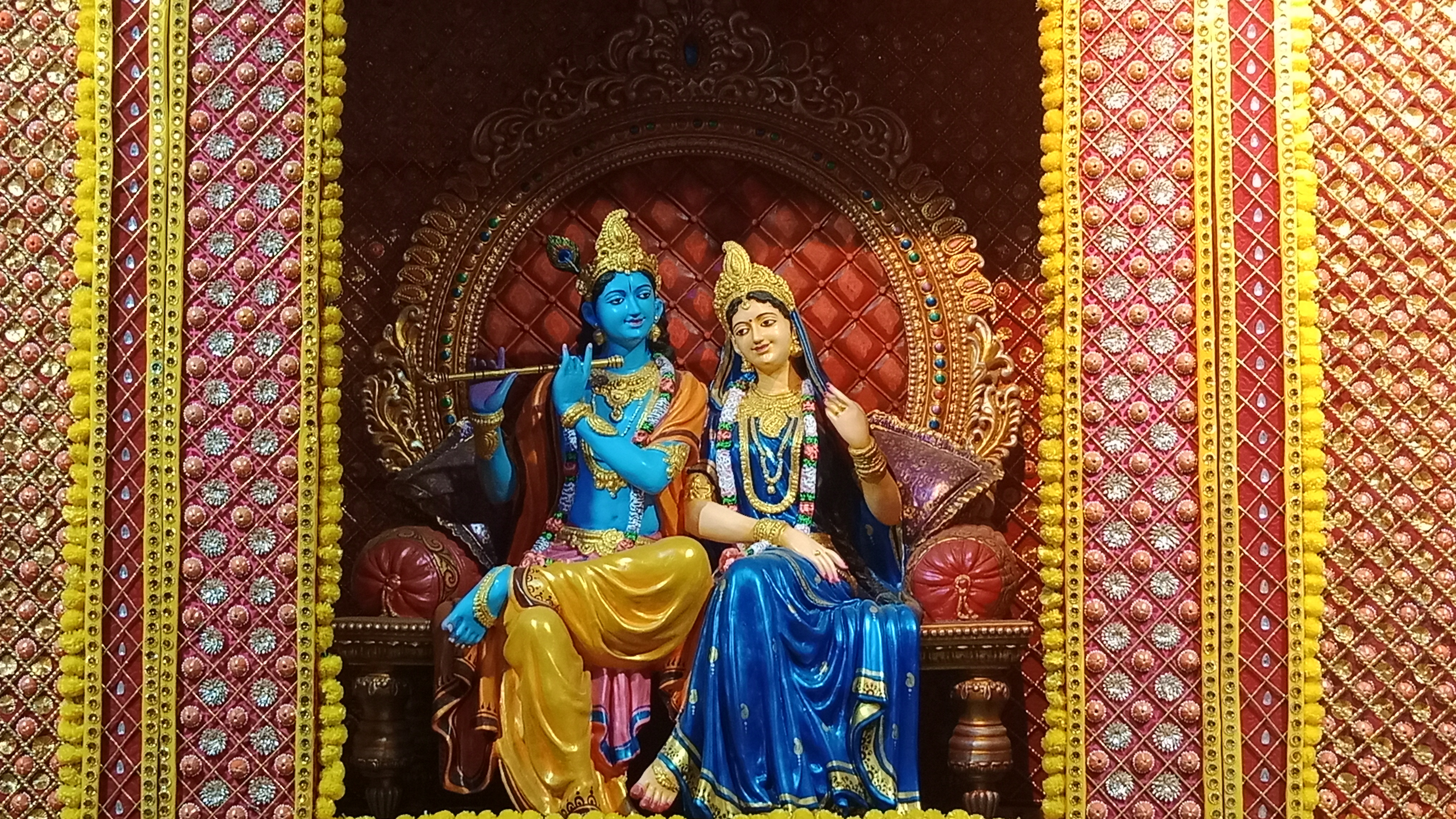
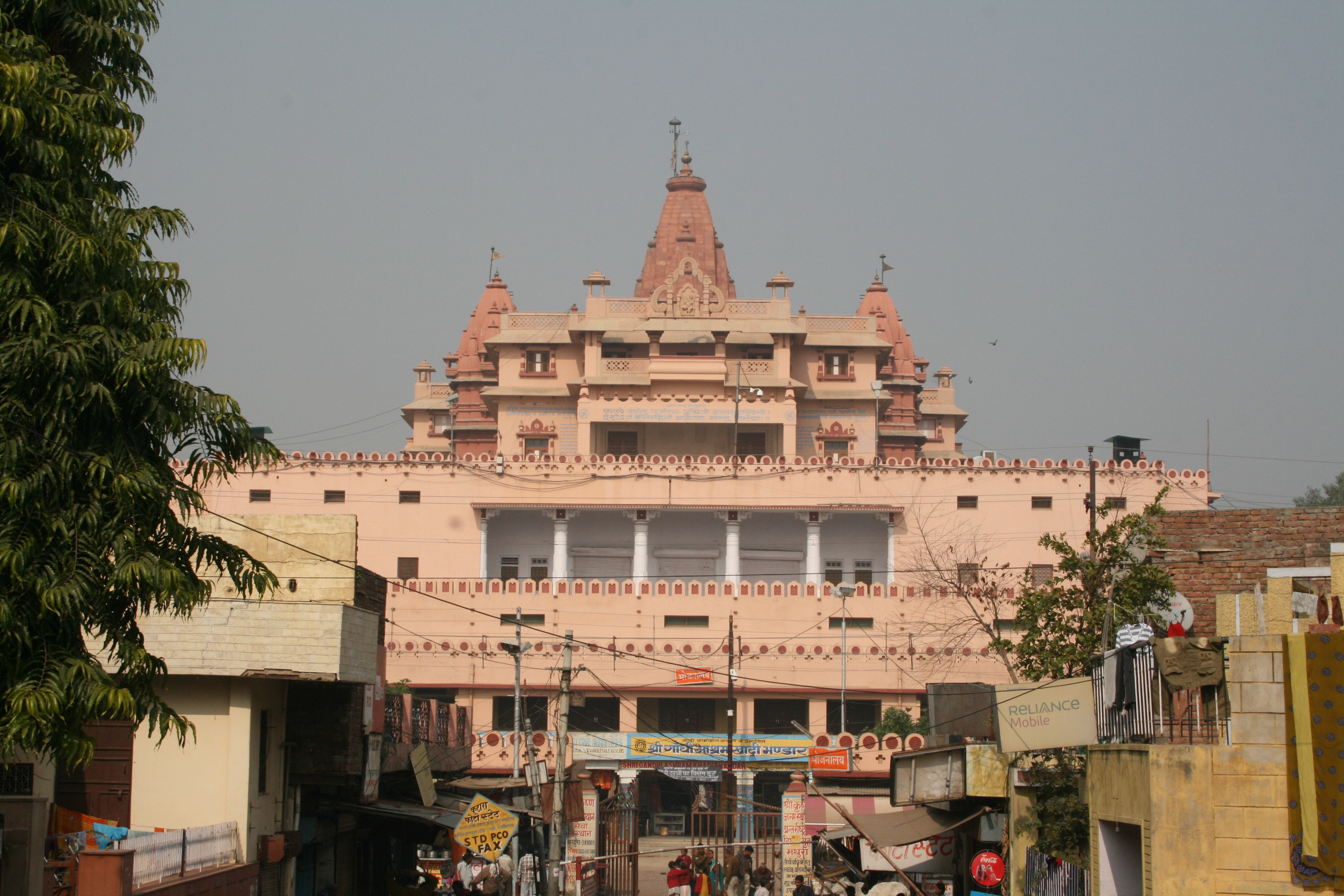
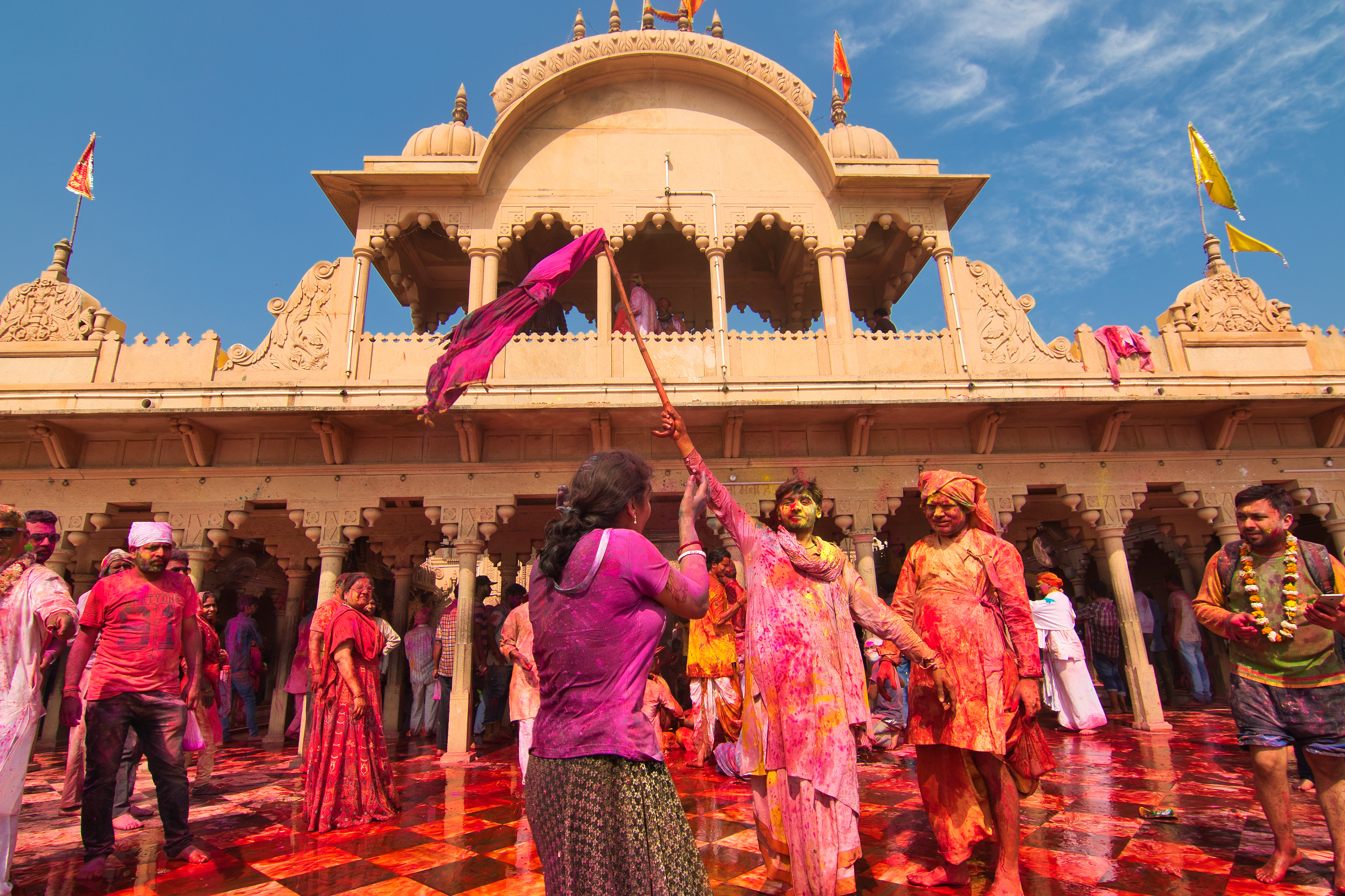
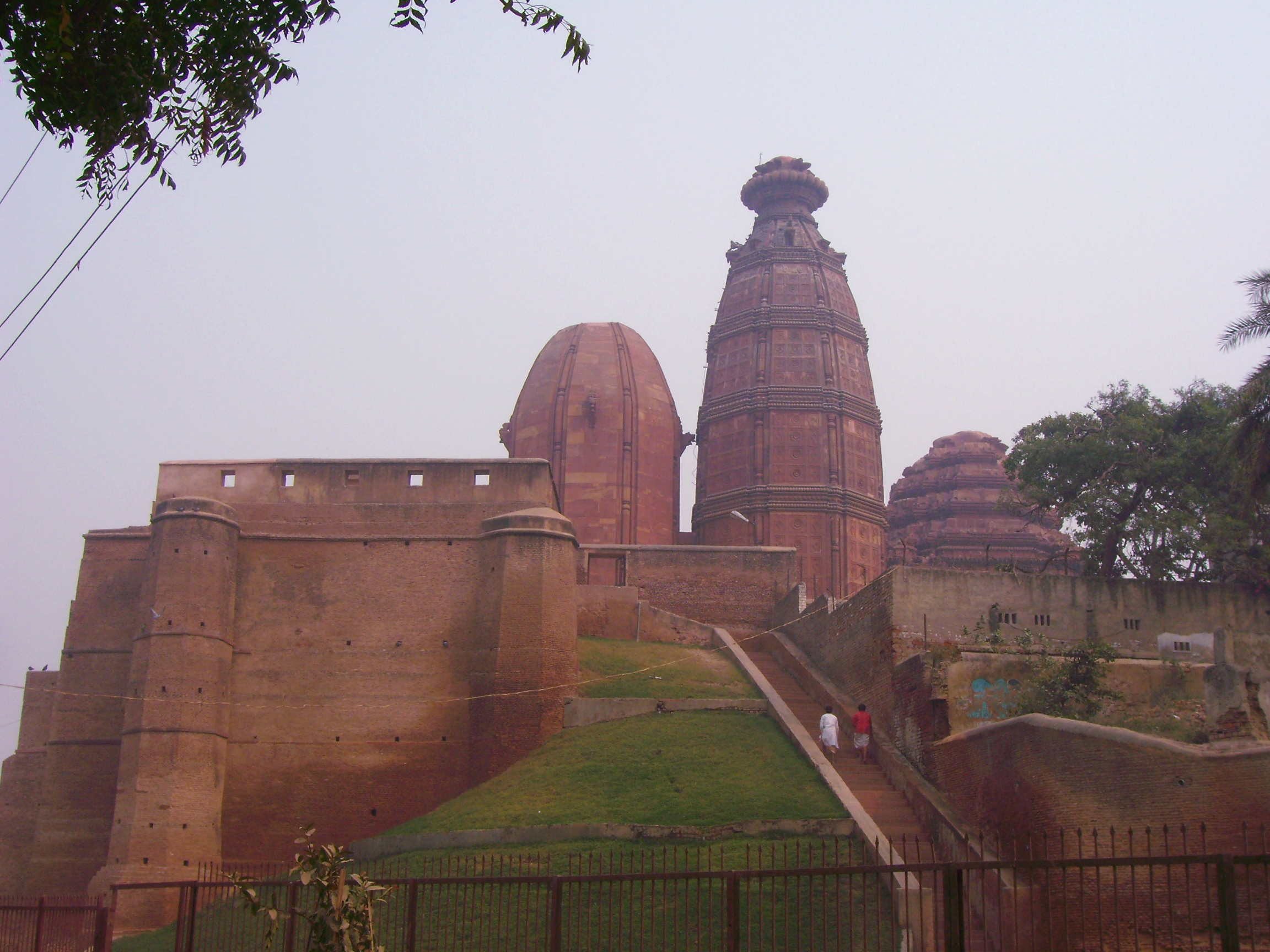
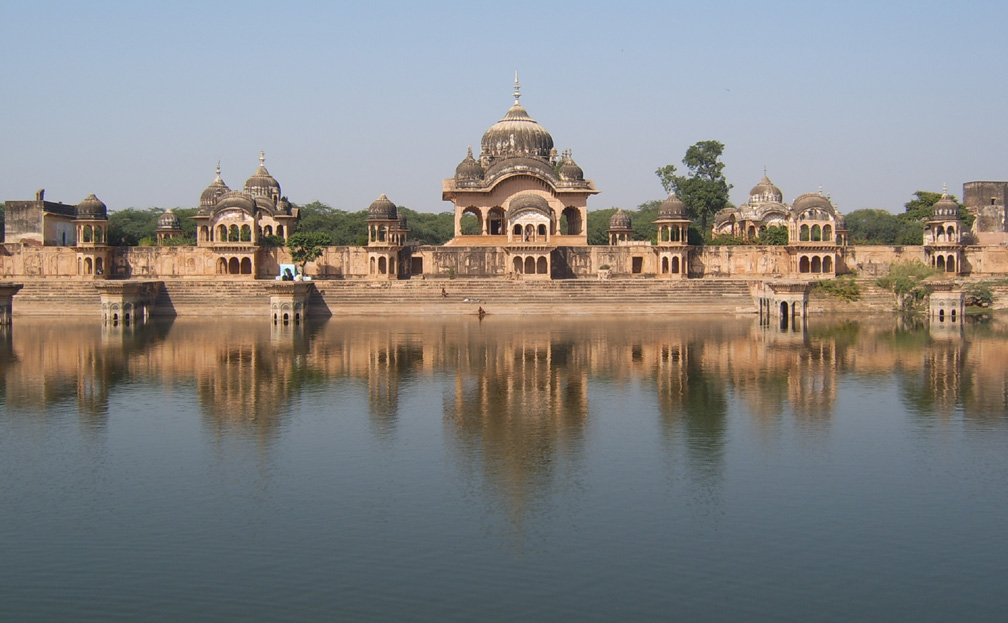
- Zigzag from top-left: Radha Krishna at Kirti Temple, Barsana, Krishna Janmasthan in Mathura, Radha Rani Temple in Barsana, Radha Madan Mohan Temple, Vrindavan and Kusum Sarovar in Govardhan Hill.
- Interactive map of Braj
- Country: India
- Region: Northern India
- Language: Braj Bhasha

Braj, also known as Vraj, Vraja, Vrij, Brij, Brajbhumi, Vrajbhumi, or Brijbhumi, is a region in India on both sides of the Yamuna river with its centre at Mathura-Vrindavan in Uttar Pradesh encompassing an area which also includes eastern Rajasthan centred on Bharatpur, Karauli, Deeg, and Dholpur, northern Madhya Pradesh centered on Morena, and southeastern Haryana centered on Palwal and Faridabad. Within Western Uttar Pradesh, it is very well demarcated culturally, the area stretches from the Mathura, Aligarh, Agra, Hathras and districts up to the Etawah district. Braj region is associated with Radha and Krishna who according to scriptures were born in Barsana and Mathura respectively. It is the main centre of Krishna circuit of Hindu pilgrimage.

It is located 150 km south of Delhi and 50 km northwest of Agra.

Ecologically, the character of Braj has drastically changed in the last 200 years, with a heavy decline in the number of wild animals along with deforestation. Writing in the late 1980s, Entwistle noted there were only a few groves left in the region, and that many sacred sites were being encroached upon by human agricultural settlements.

== Etymology ==
The term Braj is derived from the Sanskrit word व्रज vraja. Vraja was first mentioned in Rigveda, and in Sanskrit it means a pasture, shelter or resort for cattle from the Sanskrit term "vraj" which means "to go" in English.

== Braj pilgrimage circuits ==
The Braj Yatra circuit of pilgrimage was formally established by the 16th-century sadhus of the vaishnava sampradaya with fixed routes, itinerary and rituals. The area the circuit covers is spread across 2500 km^{2} with 84 kos or 300 km long periphery extending 10 km to the east and 50 km to the north and west. Braj has two main types of pilgrimage circuits, the traditional longer Braj Yatra encompassing the whole circuit, and the other shorter significantly modified contemporary point-to-point pilgrimage to visit the main sites at Mathura, Vrindavan, Gokul, Govardhan. The former, longer traditional pilgrimage route, also includes additional sacred sites Nandgaon and Barsana with travel on foot.

=== Notable pilgrimage sites ===
Notable pilgrimage sites taken from Entwistle (1987).

- Mathura (Mathurā)
  - Vishram Ghat (Viśrām Ghāṭ)
  - Krishna Janmasthan Temple Complex (Kr̥ṣṇa Janmasthān)
  - Kans Quila (Kans Kilā)
  - Dwarkadhish Temple, Mathura (Dvārkādhīś Temple)
- Madhu Forest (Madhuban)
- Radha Kund (Rādhākuṇḍ)
- Kusum Sarovar
- Govardhan Hill
- Bachhgaon (Bacchagā̃v)
- Deeg (Ḍīg)
- Kaman, Rajasthan (Kāmā̃)
- Barsana (Barsānā)
- Nandgaon, Uttar Pradesh (Nandgā̃v)
- Kamai, Uttar Pradesh (Kamāī)
- Chhata (Chātā)
- Kokilavan (Kokilāban)
- Kosi Kalan (Kosī)
- Paigaon (Paigā̃v)
- Shergarh, Uttar Pradesh (Śergaṛh)
- Bhandirvan, Vrindavan (Bhāṇḍīrvan)
- Vrindavan (Vr̥ndāvana)
  - Radha Madan Mohan Temple (Rādhā Madanmohan)
  - Banke Bihari Temple (Bā̃ke Bihārī)
  - Radha Vallabh Temple (Rādhāvallabh)
  - Radha Damodar Temple (Rādhādāmodar)
  - Nidhivan
  - Radha Raman Temple (Rādhāramaṇ)
- Baldeo (Baldev)
- Mahaban (Mahāban)
- Gokul

Brij Mahotsav is a festival that is celebrated for three days in Shukla paksha of Phalgun. It is celebrated in the month of March. Held in honour of Lord Krishna, this festival is marked by verve and zest. Villagers, in gay, multicoloured attire, can be seen singing and performing the Raslila dance (dance depicting the immortal love-story of Radha and Krishna). All of Bharatpur echoes the sound of folk melodies on this festival held on the eve of Holi.

== Demographics ==
Hindus form the majority of residents of the Braj region. The major Brahmin castes include the Sanadhyas, Gaurs, Chaubes, and Ahiwasis. Among the cultivating and pastoral castes, there are the Yadavs (Ahirs), Jats, Jadauns, Rajputs, Gujars, Meos, and Chamars. The main merchant castes are Agrawals, Khandelwals, Maheshwaris, and Barahsainis. Muslims form a small minority, with nearly negligible presence of Jains, Sikhs, and Christians.

== Braj culinary tradition ==
Braj region is known for its rich and flavorful culinary tradition. The twin cities, Mathura and Vrindavan, which are associated with Shri Krishna are main centers of Braj Cuisine.

== See also ==
Regional

- Braj language
- Vajji, the ancient region of the Vṛji janapada that Bajjika evolved from
- Charkula, Braj dance done with wooden pyramids
- Mayur, peacock dance with Krishna and Radha
- Rasiya, local style of music
- Dhrupad, Indian music genre started in Braj

Religious

- 48 kos parikrama of Kurukshetra
- Dwarka
- Hindu pilgrimage sites in India

Vedic era

- King Kuru
- Cemetery H culture
- Painted Grey Ware culture

General

- Kingdoms of Ancient India
- Regions of Haryana
- Regions of Rajasthan
- Regions of Uttar Pradesh
