= Parikrama =

Religious practice

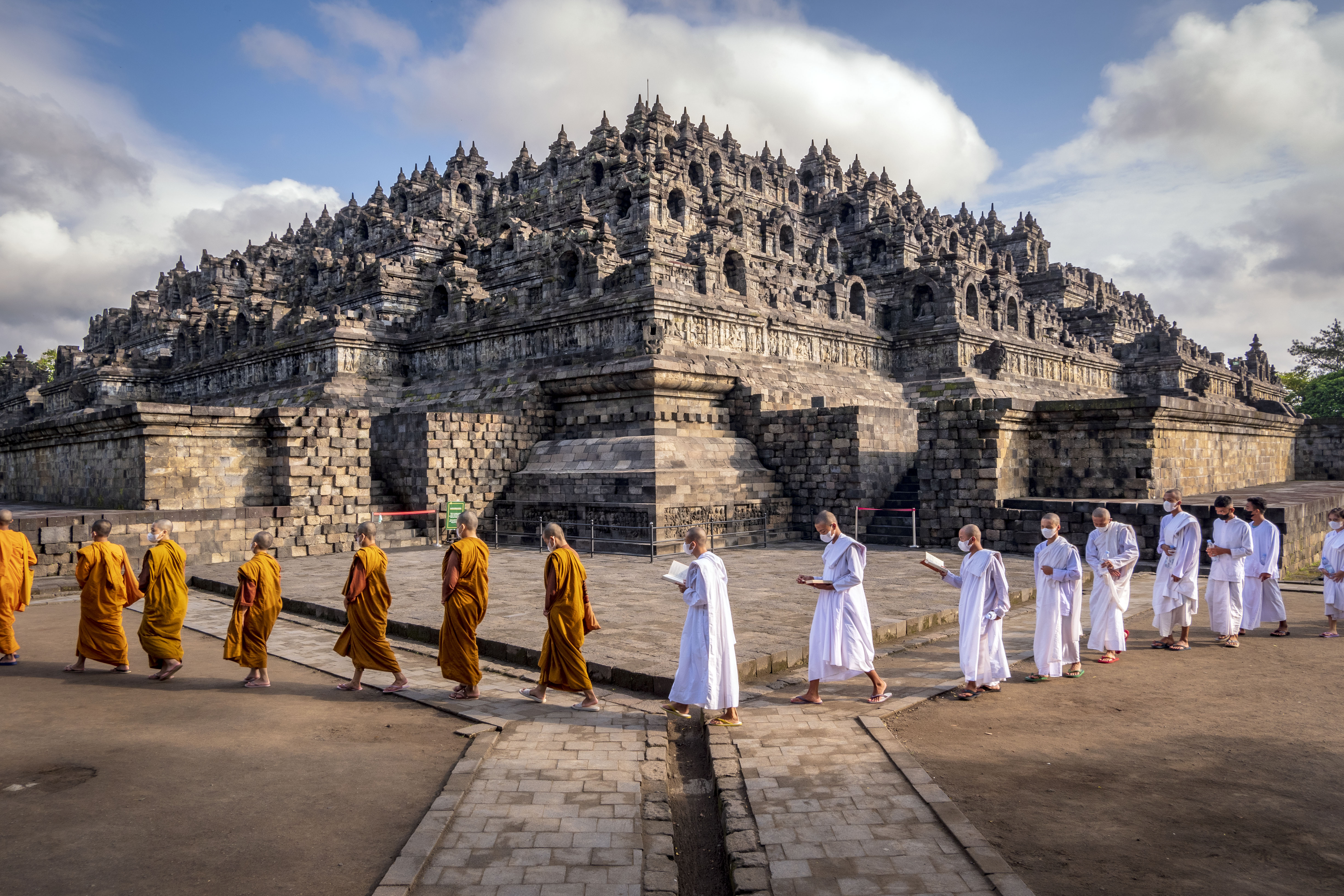
Buddhist monks performing Pradakshina ritual at Borobudur, Central Java, Indonesia

Parikrama or Pradakshina is clockwise circumambulation of sacred entities, and the path along which this is performed, as practiced in the Indic religions – Hinduism, Buddhism, Sikhism and Jainism. In Buddhism, it refers only to the path along which this is performed. In Indic religions, the parikrama is typically done after completion of traditional worship (puja) and after paying homage to the deity. Parikrama must be done with dhyāna (spiritual contemplation and meditation).

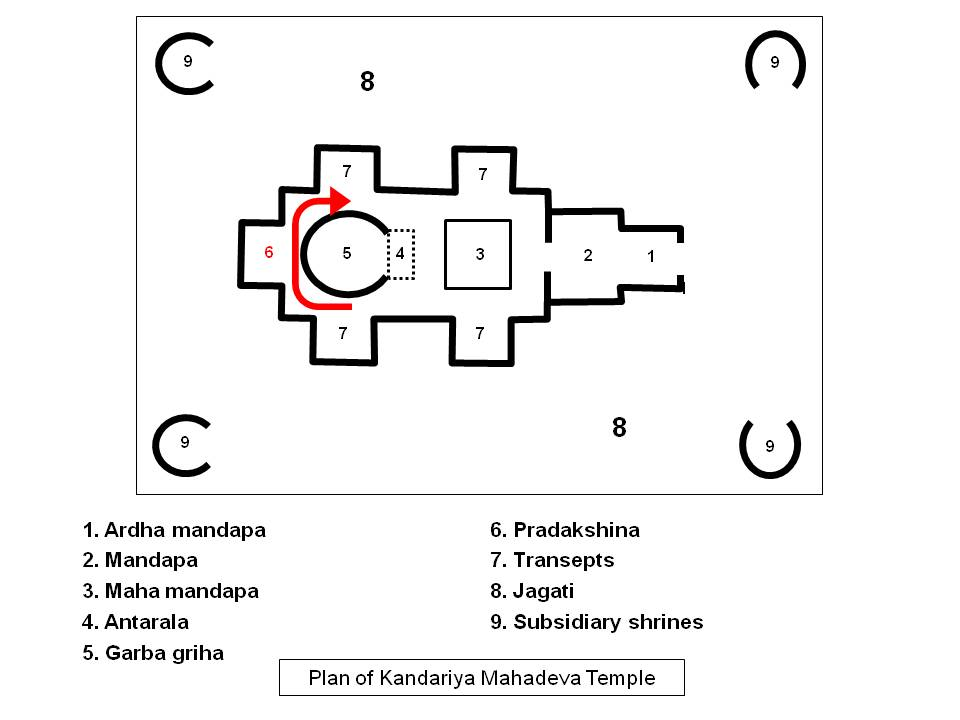
Clockwise parikrama inside a temple (red).

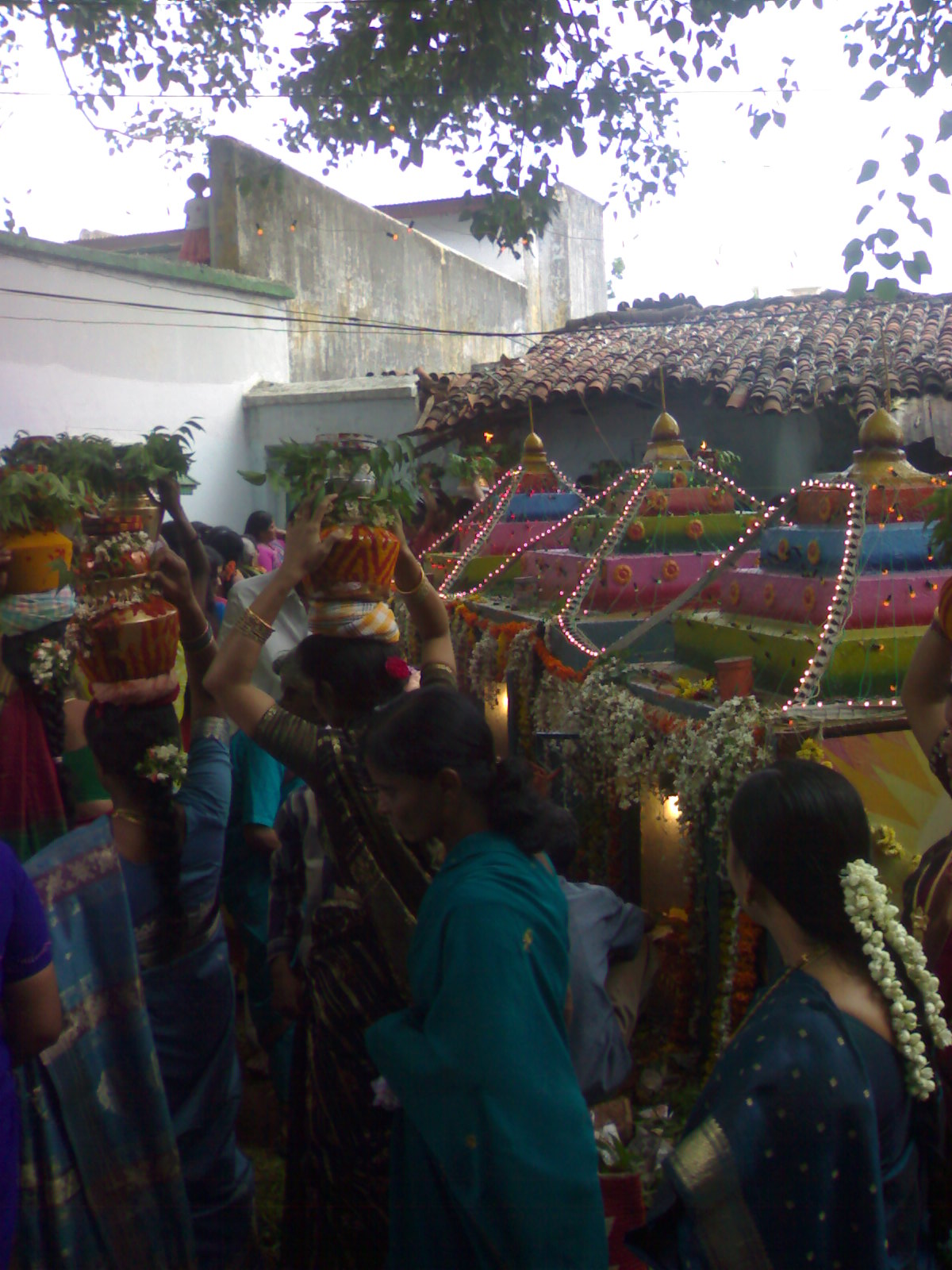
Parikrama at the temple.

In Hinduism, parikrama of religious deities in a temple, sacred rivers, sacred hills and a close cluster of temples as a symbol of prayer is an integral part of Hindu worship. Hindu temple architecture include various Pradakshina paths. There could a parikrama path surrounding the chief deity and several other broader paths concentric to the main path, although it is not uncommon to find non-concentric parikrama paths. At times the outermost parikrama path covers the whole village, town, city, thereby implying that the length of the path can stretch. Parikrama is also done around the sacred Peepal tree, tulsi (Indian basil plant), and agni (sacred fire or the fire God), and agni parikrama, known as Mangal phera, is a part of the Hindu wedding ceremony.

In Sikhism, the term is used in an architectural manner to refer to a circumambulatory terrace around a sarovar (temple-tank), such as the one found in the Golden Temple complex in Amritsar.

== Etymology ==
Parikrama means "the path surrounding something" in Sanskrit, and is also known as Pradakshina ("to the right"), representing circumambulation. Both words are mostly used in the context of religious practice of circumambulation of sacred entities.

Parikrama is defined as "Circumbulatory or pathway around the shrine of the temples by keeping time is a common form of prayer in India. It includes Narmada, Shetrunjaya, Girnar. This pathway made of stone around the shrine is called Pradakshina path."

== Important pilgrimage circuits of indic-faiths ==
See yatra circuits.

== Practices of Indian-origin religions ==
=== Buddhist practice ===
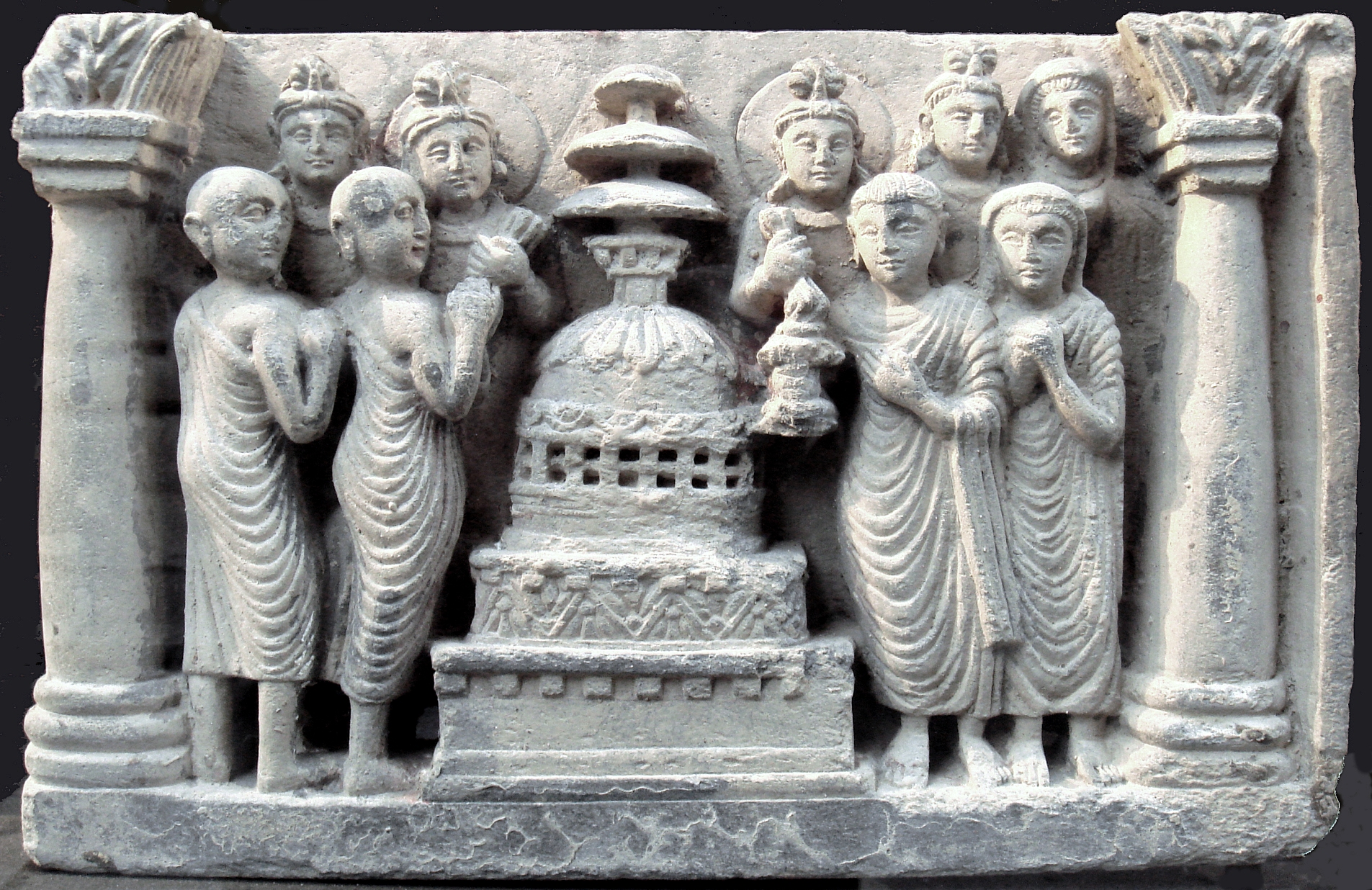
Buddhist monks and devotees circumambulating a stupa.

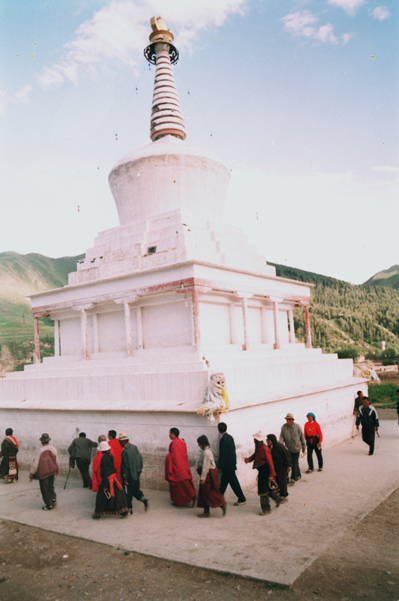
Pradakhshina round a stupa in China.

In Buddhism circumambulation or pradakhshina has been an important ritual since early times. Sacred structures such as stupa or images have a pradakhshina path around them. The chaitya is a distinct ancient type of building that only survives in Indian rock-cut architecture, a hall with a stupa at the far end, always built with a rounded apse-like end, to allow pradakhshina. A mandapa (prayer hall), added in the front transforms the original stupa into the stupa shrine — as a sacred entity which requires a circumambulatory path around it for the purpose of worship. The whole structure is planned in such a way that it becomes the centre of the mandala and symbolically represents Mount Meru.

Within Pure Land Buddhism, circumambulation became closely associated with nenbutsu practice, especially in intensive retreat settings. Practitioners commonly circumambulate a statue or image of Amitābha Buddha while continuously reciting his name, thereby uniting physical movement, vocalization, and mental focus on rebirth in the Pure Land. This form of practice is systematized in the Tiantai tradition by Zhiyi (538–597) in his formulation of the constantly walking samādhi, one of the four samādhi types described in the Mohe zhiguan. In this samādhi, practitioners circumambulate an image of Amitābha for an extended period, traditionally ninety days, without sitting or lying down, while maintaining uninterrupted mindfulness of the Buddha. Through this disciplined and sustained circumambulation, the practitioner aims to stabilize concentration, purify karmic obscurations, and cultivate direct contemplative engagement with the Buddha as the object of practice.

Buddhist faithful may perform pradakhshina by prostrating themselves at every step, thus greatly prolonging the process. The most extreme pradakhshina is that of the sacred Mount Kailash in Tibet, a mountain trek some 52 km (32 mi) long, at altitudes between 15,000 ft (4,600 m) and 18,200 ft (5,500 m). This may also be undertaken by Hindus and Jains, and some pilgrims progress by prostration, taking some weeks.

=== Hindu practices ===
==== Significance and symbolism of parikrama ====
The temple structure reflects the symbolism of the Hindu association of the spiritual transition from daily life to spiritual perfection as a journey through stages. Parikrama paths are present through which worshipers move in a clockwise direction, starting at the sanctuary doorway and moving inward toward the inner sanctum where the deity is enshrined. This represents translation of the spiritual concept of transition through levels in life into bodily movements by the worshipers as they move inwardly through ambulatory halls to the most sacred centre of spiritual energy of the deity.

==== Number of Pradakshinas for various deities ====
For each deity, the minimum number of Pradakshinas to be done are specified.

- Ganesha: 1 or 3
- Hanuman: 3
- Shiva: half or 3
- Vishnu: 3 or 4
- Ayyappa: 5
- Subrahmanya (Kartikeya): 6
- Durga, Devi: 1, 4 or 9
- Peepal Tree: 7
- Surya : 2 or 7

The Swayambhu Agama says that doing Pradakshina 21 times to any deity is sanctified.

==== Shayana Pradakshinam ====
Shayana Pradakshinam is done by prostration in a lying posture. It starts with a Sashtanga Namaskara in front of the sanctum sanctorum. In Sashtanga Namaskara, the devotees have six parts of their bodies touching the ground. Thus forehead, chest, stomach, hands, knees and toes touch the ground. The folded hands will be directed always towards the deity. In this pose, the devotees circumambulate on the Pradakshina path. The relatives and friends of the devotees help them to roll around.

==== Shaivite Pradakshinam ====
In Shiva temples, the devotees start the Pradakshina as usual from the front and go clockwise until they reach the gomukhi (the outlet for abhisheka water) from the Sanctum Sanctorum. As usual the clockwise perambulation is maintained outside of the Bali stones. The drainage outlet for the ritual ablution offered on the Shiva Linga with water, milk, curd, coconut water, ghee, ashes (bhasma) etc. is not to be crossed. So the worshippers have to return in anti-clockwise direction until they reach the other side of the drainage outlet to complete the circle. During this anti-clockwise perambulation, the devotee should tread a path inside of the Bali stones. The Bali stones are always to be kept the right side of the devotees. After reaching the drainage outlet, they have to return to the front in the clockwise direction keeping the path outside the Bali stones. Thus one Pradakshina is completed.

A legend related to goddess Parvati (Shiva's wife) and her two sons illustrates the importance of Pradakshina or Parikrama. It is said that the goddess asked her two sons to circumambulate the universe to gain worldly knowledge. While her first son Kartikeyan spent decades to go round the world on his peacock, her second son Ganesha walked a full circle around his mother and justified his action by stating that the World was contained within the figure of the mother. This legend justifies the importance that Hindus attach to the practice of Parikrama, and also the importance of motherhood in Hindu psychology. Another version of the same story replaces the figure of Parvati with Shiva himself.

=== Comparison with non-Indic religions ===
Like Parikrama in Hinduism, Muslims perform circumambulation around Kaaba during their Hajj which they call tawaf. The circumambulation during Hajj is done in a counterclockwise manner. In contrast, Hindu, Buddhist as well as Jain traditions circumambulate a shrine or sacred site clockwise. The only exception is during paying last respects to a dead body during a cremation or event marking a funeral, where the traditional circumambulation in Indian religions is counter-clockwise.

== Sites ==
=== Hindu locations ===
==== Ayodhya's Lord Rama parikramas ====
In the temple city of Ayodhya in Uttar Pradesh state of India, there are following 5 Parikramas all of which commence by bathing in the holy Sarayu River first and by performing sankalpa ritual of moral oath and the pilgrimage ends at the same place at the Sarayu by releasing this sankalpa oath. Parikramas connect the three-tier Hindu cosmology, namely the outer-most macro (Mandala), the middle-one meso (Kshetra), and micro (Puri the garbhagriha inner sanctum), via the shrines en route. Parikramas, each forming an irregular circular loop, are listed in the order of increasing length from the innermost to the outermost:

- Antargrihi Parikrama (Sanctum Sanctorum Circumambulation): of the inner sanctum sanctorum of the Ram Mandir - the birthplace of Lord Rama.
- Ramkot ki Parikrama (Rama Birthplace Temple Circumambulation): around the Rama Birthplace temple complex.
- Ayodhya Panchakoshi Parikrama (5 Kos Circumambulation) - nearly 15 km: cover 30 most sacred places related to the birthplace of Lord Rama which can be completed within six hours, through traditionally it is performed over a two-day period. Over two hundred thousand devotees including around 50 thousand sadhus from Prayag (Allahabad), Haridwar, Mathura and Kashi (Varanasi) participate in the parikrama, and full security arrangements are made for the religious occasion.
- Ayodhya Chaudahakoshi Parikrama (14 Kos Circumambulation) - nearly 42 km: from birthplace (Ramakot) to death-place (Guptar Ghat) linking 36 sacred places related to the life experience of Lord Rama.
- Ayodhya Chaurasikoshi Parikrama (84 Kos Circumambulation) - over 275 km: the oldest and the longest route linked with 148 sacred places and 84 lakh (8.4 million) yonis. The circumambulation path has been notified as the National Highway NH-227B, upgraded at the cost of INR3,350 crore to the 45-meter wide, 4-lane, paved-shoulder with flood lights and pilgrim facilities along the way passing through 5 districts of Ayodhya, Ambedkar Nagar, Barabanki, Basti, Gonda connecting temples, tirthas, ashrams, kundas, ghats, etc.

==== Braj's Lord Krishna parikramas ====
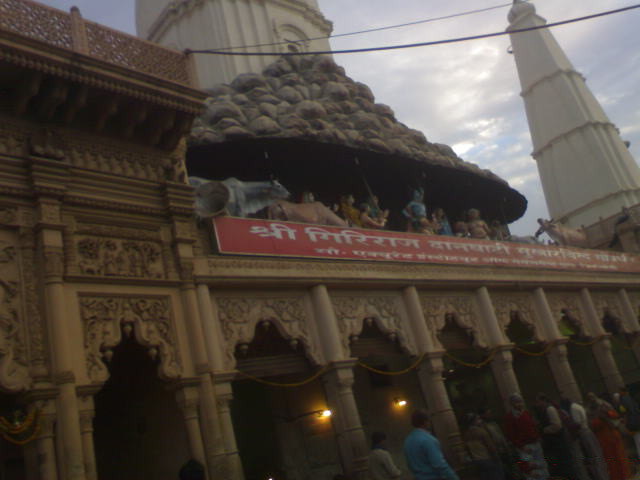
Govardhan Temple starting point of Govardhan Parikrama.

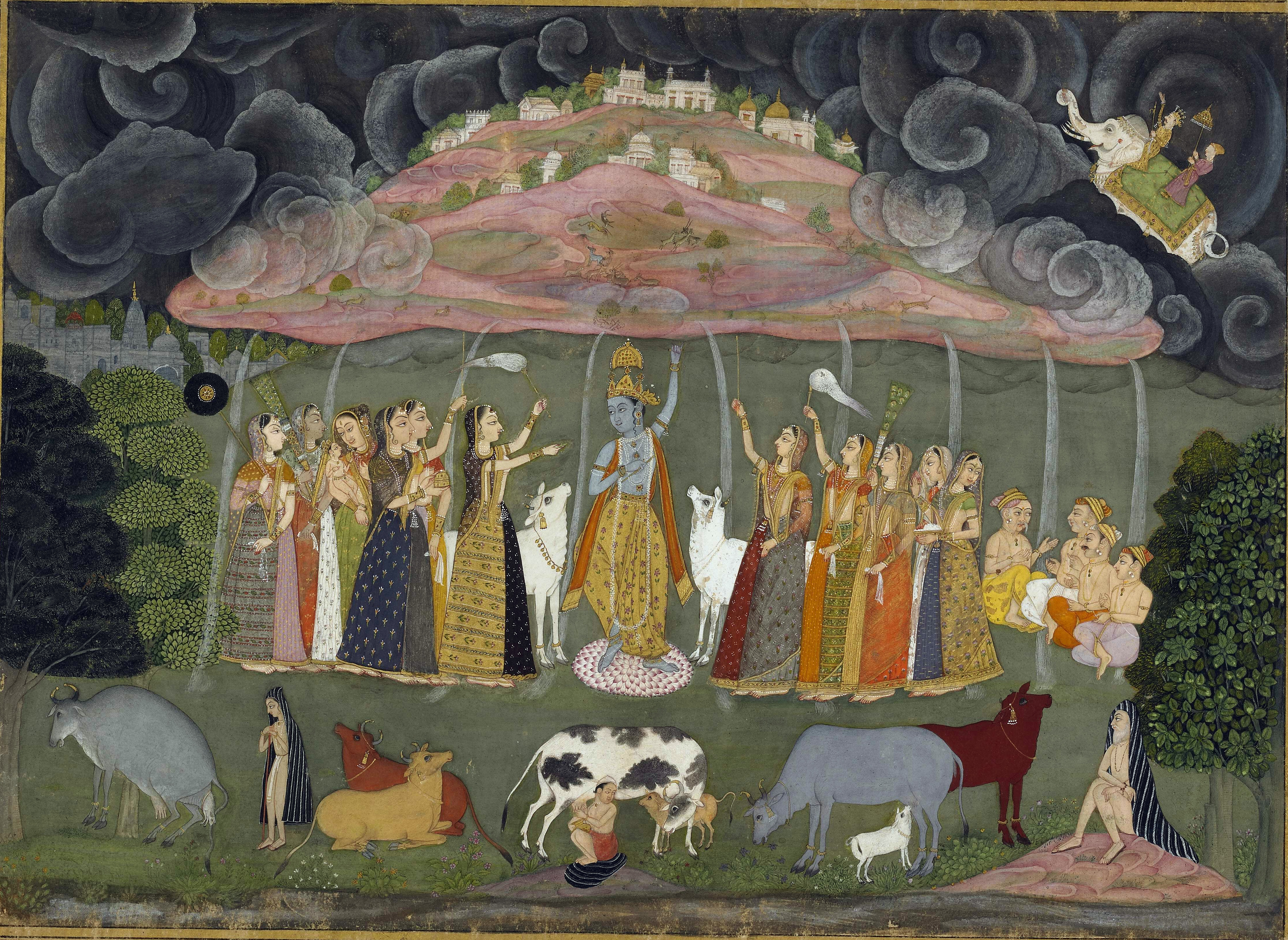
Krishna lifting the Govardhana hill.

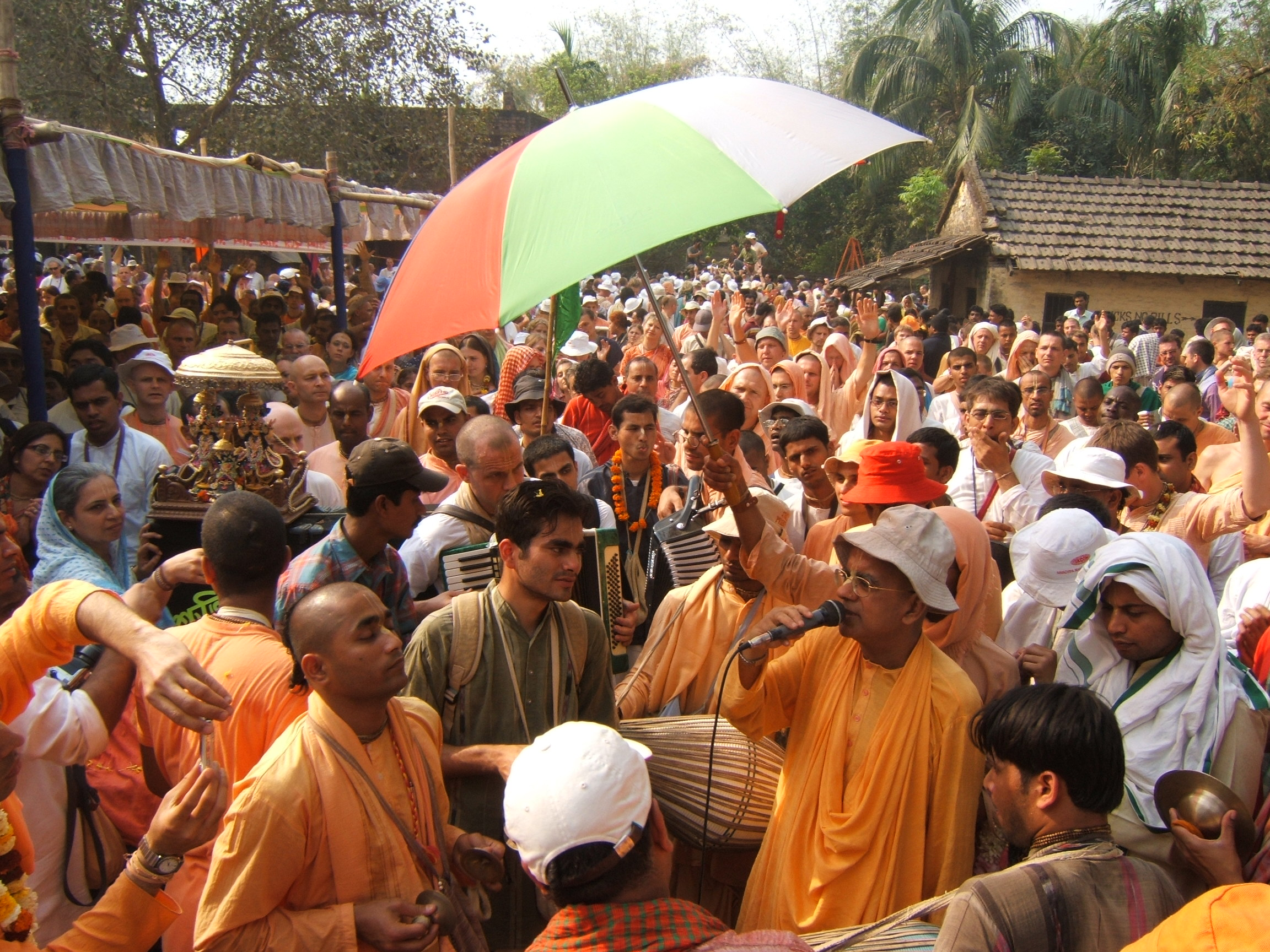
Parikrama by ISKCON devotees.

Braj or Vraj area has several parikramas:

- Braj Chaurasi Kos Parikrama (84 Kos Yatra), 252 km long: most extensive parikrama in the Braj covering 12 forests (vanas), 24 gardens, 20 kunds (ponds), and villages like Barsana, Nandgaon, Gokul, and Baldeo, along with Mathura and Vrindavan cities and takes several days to complete. Since 500 years Vraja Mandala Parikrama has been performed during October–November months. It is 84 Krosh long, taking 1–2 months depending on the route and speed visits twelve forests, known as vans, and twenty-four groves, known as upavans. The twelve forests are Madhuvan, Talavan, Kumudvan, Bahulavan, Kamavan, Khadiravan, Vrindavan, Bhadravan, Bhandiravan, Belvan, Lohavan, and Mahavan. The twenty-four groves are Gokul, Govardhan, Barsana, Nandagram, Sanket, Paramadra, Aring, Sessai, Mat, Uchagram, Kelvan, Sri Kund, Gandharvavan, Parsoli, Bilchhu, Bacchavan, Adibadri, Karahla, Ajnokh, Pisaya, Kokilavan, Dadhigram, Kotvan, and Raval.
- Mathura Parikrama (circumambulation of Mathura city), 15 km: covers sacred sites like Vishram Ghat, Kankali Devi Temple, Bhuteshwar Mahadev, Rangeshwar Mahadev, and Saraswati Kund.
- Vrindavan Parikrama (circumambulation of Vrindavan city), 10–15 km: connects many temples, ghats, and sacred spots associated with Radha and Krishna's pastimes, such as Banke Bihari Mandir, Madan Mohan Mandir, Keshi Ghat, and Imli Tala. Vrindavan Parikrama is a spiritual walk undertaken by devotees around Vrindavan town in Uttar Pradesh. It has no particular start or end place. As long as one ends at the same place one starts, the purpose is served. One possible path is to start from the famous ISKCON temple, covers a distance of 10 km (6.2 mi)in about three hours. It is generally done on Ekadasi (eleventh lunar day of the waxing and waning of Moon). The route followed is from Keshi ghat with purification, walk close to the Krishna Balarama Temple, the Krishna-Balarama tree, Gautam Rishi's Ashrama (located on the left while on the right is Varaha Ghata), the Kaliya Ghata, Madana Mohana Temple with red sandstone tower, small wooden bridge, to Imli Tala, the Imli Tala tree, Sringara Vata (on the right), the Kesi Ghat (one of the famous Monuments in Vrindavan), the Tekari Rani temple, the Jagannatha temple and the small temple of Lord Chaitanya Mahaprabhu and in the final stretch cross the Mathura-Vrindavan road. After crossing this road, after another 1 km walking, reach the starting point of the Parikrama. During the Parikrama, one chants the mantras (Jap) within, uses body power (Tap) to accomplish the Parikrama and keeps a fast (not eat anything) (Vrata) until the Parikrama is completed.
- Govardhan Parikrama (circumambulation of Govardhan town and hill), 21 km (7 kos): commemorates Lord Krishna lifting the Govardhan Hill to protect the residents of Braj from Indra's wrath. There is also a shorter "Chhoti 3-kosi Parikrama" of about 7–9 km. Govardhan hill which has great religious significance in view of its association with Lord Krishna, presently at its highest point is just 25-metre (82 ft) high and is a wide hill near Mathura Vrindavan in Uttar Pradesh, India. It is a narrow sandstone hill known as Giriraj which is about 8 kilometres (5 mi) in length. After Krishna protected the inhabitants of Vraj Vridavan from the wrath of Indra, he counseled them to worship Govardhana hill and they did by way of a Puja (worship) and a Parikrama (circumambulation) around the hill. Thus, a festival in commemoration of the lifting of Mount Govardhan, near Mathura, by Krishna came into vogue as 'Govardhan Puja' when Mount Govardhan is worshipped, the day after Deepawali (festival of lights) is celebrated. Pious people keep awake the whole night and cook 56 (or 108) different types of food for the bhog (the offering of food to God) to Krishna. This ceremony is called 'ankut' or 'annakuta' which means a mountain of food. Various types of food – cereals, pulses, fruit, vegetables, chutneys, pickles, and salads – are offered to the Deity and then distributed as 'prasada' to devotees. Thousands of devotees bring offerings for Giriraj. Followed by this pooja, the devotees perform the Govardhana Parikrama. Govardana Parikrama [circumambulation — going 21 kilometres (13 mi) around the hill] is a sacred ritual performed by many believers as spiritual purification. There is no time limit for performing this Parikrama, but for those who perform the dandavata (full prostration) Parikrama, an arduous form which may take weeks and sometimes even months to complete. Dandavata Parikrama is performed by standing in one spot, offering obeisances like a stick (danda) by lying flat on the ground and then continuing, contiguously, until the entire route is covered. It is also said that some sadhus (Hindu holy men) perform 108 obeisances in one spot before moving to the next. This can take a number of months to complete. This ritual of Parikrama is considered to be even better if it is done with milk. A clay pot filled with milk, with a hole at the bottom, is carried by the devotees in one hand and a pot filled with dhoop (incense smoke) in another. An escort continuously fills up the pot with milk until the parikrama is completed. Parikrama is also done with candy being handed out to children, en route. The divine tree 'Kalpavriksha' planted by GreenMan Vijaypal Baghel at each Kunda of this parikrma route, not only Kalpavriksha, he is planting with dedication much more others traditional & medicinal flora's species around holy Govardhan hill likely 'Tridev Vriksha', paras peepal, Rudraksha, Kadmba, pakad, vat vriksha etc. who have spiritual and religious values to make Green Parikrma. Parikrama of Govardhana hill starts at the Manasi-Ganga Kund (lake) and then after having darsan of Lord Harideva, from Radha-kunda village, where the Vrindavan road meets the parikrama path. After parikrama of 21 kilometres, covering important tanks, shilas and shrines such as Radha Kunda, Syama Kunda, Dan Ghati, Mukharavinda, Rinamochana Kunda, Kusuma Sarovara and Punchari, it ends at Mansi Ganga Kund only.
- Barsana Parikrama (circumambulation of Barsana), 2 kosi (7 km) and 1 kosi (4 km): birthplace of Radha Rani, includes Brahmachal Parvat, Sankari Khor, Radha Rani Temple, Priya Kund, Dangarh, Mangarh, and Vilasgarh. Barsana Parikrama is a spiritual walk undertaken by devotees around Barsana village of Shrimati Radha Rani in Uttar Pradesh. It has no particular start or end place. As long as one ends at the same place one starts, the purpose is served. One possible path is to start from the famous Rangili Gali where people gather for world famous Lathmar Holi, covers a distance of 5 km (3.1 mi)in about one hour. It is generally done on Ekadasi (eleventh lunar day of the waxing and waning of Moon). The route followed is from Sankari Khor with purification, walk close to the Radha Rani Temple, Ghavar Kund or Shri Radha Sarovar, Ghavar Van (located on the left while on the right is way to Ghavar Kund & Shri Ghavar Van Bihari Ji Temple, Maan Mandir on a height, Mor Kutir, Shri Daan Bihari, Shri Kushal Bihari Ji Temple or Jaipur Temple & the most famous temple of Shri Ladlilaal Temple from where our starting point i.e. Ragili Gali is near. During the Parikrama, one chants the mantras (Jap or Hymns) within, uses body power (Tap) to accomplish the Parikrama and keeps a fast (not eat anything) (Vrata) until the Parikrama is completed.
- Nandgaon Parikrama (circumambulation of Nandgaon village area): village where Lord Krishna spent his childhood, includes Yashoda Kund, Moti Kund, Lalita Kund, Mor Kund, Charan Pahadi, Pawan Sarovar, and the Nand Mandir.
- Gokul Parikrama (circumambulation of Gokul village area), 10 km: covers sacred sites connected to Krishna's early life, such as Bajrang Ghat, Putna Kund, Harihar Tila, Ramanreti, Shrikund, Gop Talai, Kamal Kund, Thakurani Ghat, and Yashoda Ghat.
- Baldeo Parikrama (circumambulation of Baldeo village), 2 kosi (5 km): the place associated with Lord Balarama, Krishna's elder brother, covers Ksheer Sagar and the Dauji Temple.
- Kokilavan Parikrama (circumambulation of Kokilavan forest): known for its temple.

==== Kurukshetra' Lord Krishna parikrama ====
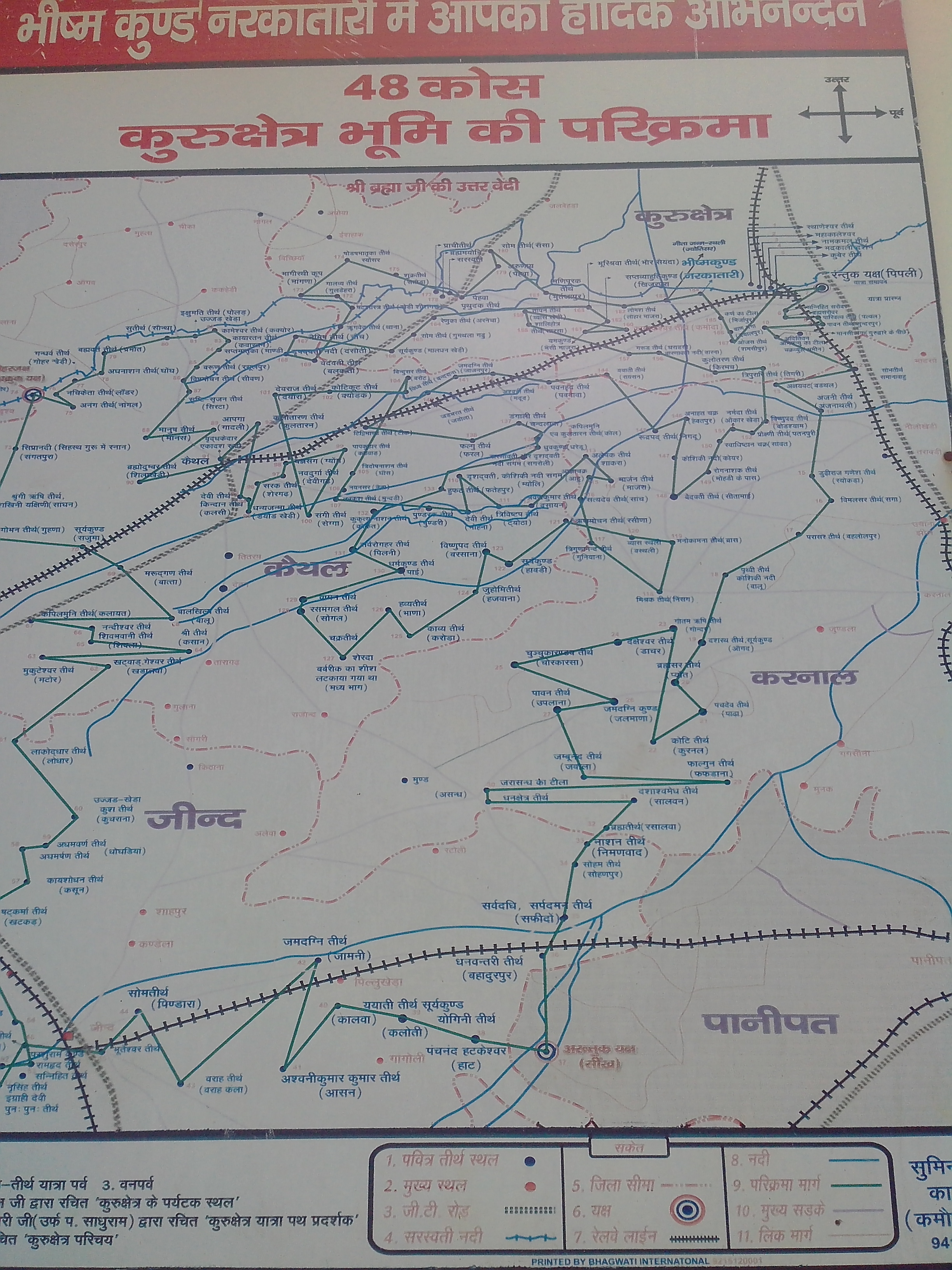
Map with description of 48 kos parikrama (approx. 96 miles circle) around the holy city of Kurukshetra, displayed at Ban Ganga/Bhishma Kund.

48 kos parikrama of Kurukshetra is a 48 kos circumambulation of over 200 Mahabharata-related and other vedic era tirthas around the holy city of Kurukshetra in the state of Haryana, India.

==== Girnar's Lili parikrama ====
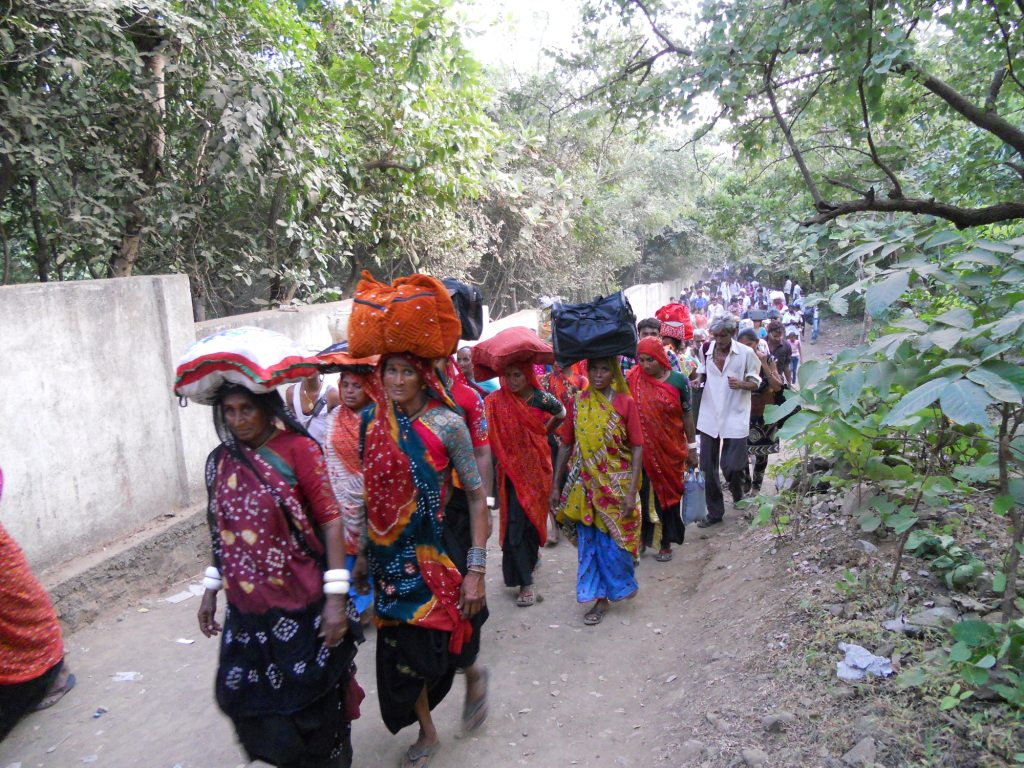
Pilgrims on Girnar Parikrama

Lili Parikrama or Girnar Parikrama is a seven-day festival held at Mount Girnar in Junagadh district of Gujarat, India. The pilgrimage involves a climb of 10,000 steps to reach the top to the sacred Mount Girnar venerated by both Hindus and Jains. The Jains call it Girnar parikrama. Devotees from all over the country participate in the festival. Of the seven peaks of Girnar, five are important viz., Ambamata, Gorakhnath, Augadh, Lord Neminatha Tonk or Guru Dattatreya as known by Hindus and Kalika. Devotees visit various sacred places during the parikarama, including the Bhavnath Shiv Temple, Dudheshwar Mahadev Temple, Damodar Kund, Bhartruchari Cave, Sorath Mahal, Bhim Kund and Shiv Kund.

==== Narmada parikrama ====
The importance of the Narmada River as sacred is testified by the fact that the pilgrims perform a holy pilgrimage of a Parikrama or Circumambulation of the river. The Narmada Parikrama, as it is called, is considered to be a meritorious act that a pilgrim can undertake. Many sadhus (saints) and pilgrims walk on foot from the Arabian Sea at Bharuch in Gujarat, along the river, to the source in Maikal Mountains (Amarkantak hills) in Madhya Pradesh and back along the opposite bank of the river. It is a 2,600-kilometre (1,600 mi) walk. The Parikrama is also performed along the southern bank from its source (Amarkantak hills) to the mouth (Bharuch) and returning along the northern bank, and it is considered to be of the highest religious efficacy.

During the Narmada Parikrama, devotees have to pass through a place called Shulpaneshwar ki Jhari, a religious place in Gujarat with links dating back to the Mahabharata epic story. The legend says that the Pandavas returning victorious from Kurukshetra war were intercepted at Shulpaneswar by Eklavya and his group of tribal Bhils and looted them (Pandvaas) of all their belongings. Since then it is a custom that pilgrims on a Narmada Parikrama, while passing through this place, expect to be stripped of all their belongings leaving them with the bare essentials to carry on until some philanthropists give them donations on the way to carry on. With construction of the Sardar Sarovar Dam in Gujarat on the Narmada River, the Shulpaneshwar Temple has submerged under the reservoir, necessitating the pilgrims to take a circuitous route to continue on their journey.

== See also ==
- The Archaeology of Hindu Ritual
- Culture of India
- Hindu pilgrimage sites in India
- Kumbh Mela
- List of Hindu festivals
- Religious tourism in India
- Tawaf
- Tourism in India
- Yatra
- Girivalam
