= Chahan =

Chahan may refer to:

== Places ==
- Chahan, Kerman, a village in Kerman province, Iran
- Chahan, Iranshahr, a village in Sistan and Baluchestan province, Iran
- Chahan, Nik Shahr, a village in Sistan and Baluchestan province, Iran

== Others ==
- Chahan (dish), a Japanese fried rice dish
- Shahan Shahnour, a French-Armenian writer and poet

== See also ==
- Chhan (disambiguation)
- Shahan (disambiguation)
