= Chan (surname) =

Chan is a non-pinyin romanisation of multiple Chinese surnames, based on different varieties of Chinese.

Among respondents to the 2000 United States census, Chan was the 12th-most common surname among Asian Pacific Americans, and 459th-most common overall, with 59,811 bearers (91.0% of whom identified as Asian/Pacific Islander). Chan was the ninth-most common Chinese surname in Singapore as of 1997 (ranked by English spelling, rather than by Chinese characters). Roughly 48,400 people, or 1.9% of the Chinese Singaporean population, bore the surname Chan.

== Cantonese romanisation of 陈/陳 ==
Chan is a Cantonese romanisation of the surname spelled in pinyin as Chén (Chinese: 陳).

- Chan Kong-sang (陳港生; born 1954) a.k.a. Jackie Chan, Hong Kong actor
- Danny Chan Pak Keung (陳百強; 1958–1993), Hong Kong singer, songwriter and actor
- Diana Ming Chan (張陳維明; 1929–2008), American social worker of Chinese descent
- Amy Chan (badminton) (陳念慈; born 1961), Hong Kong badminton player
- Isabel Chan (陳逸寧; born 1979), Hong Kong actress
- Gemma Chan (陳靜; born 1982), English actress and model of Chinese descent
- Eugene Chan (陳西林), Hong Kong linguist
- Agnes Chan (陳美齡), Hong-Kong-born university professor, essayist and novelist
- Sunney Chan (陳長謙; 1936–2025), American biophysical chemist

== Hokkien romanisation of 曾 ==
Chan is a Hokkien romanisation of the surname spelled in pinyin as Zēng (曾). People with this surname include:

- James Chan Soon Cheong (曾順祥; 1926–2023), Malaysian Roman Catholic bishop
- Jose Mari L. Chan (曾煥福; born 1945), Filipino singer-songwriter
- Chris Chan (曾成兴; born 1950), Singaporean sports administrator
- Chan Soo Sen (曾士生; born 1956), Singaporean politician
- Soo K. Chan (曾仕乾; born 1962), Singaporean architect
- Chan Kwok Fai (曾國琿; born 1982), Malaysian singer
- Dinah Chan (曾秀卿; born 1986), Singapore road cyclist
- Jasper Chan (曾羽辉; born 1988), Singaporean footballer
- Chan Kwong Beng (曾廣銘; born 1988), Malaysian badminton player
- Chan Boon Yong (曾文勇), Malaysian diamantaire
- Jannie Chan (曾秀丽), Singaporean luxury retail businesswoman
- Priscelia Chan (曾詩梅), Singaporean actress
- Chan Tien Ghee (曾長義), Malaysian businessman

== Mandarin Wade–Giles romanisation of 詹 ==
Chan is a Mandarin Wade–Giles romanisation (often used in Taiwan) of the surname spelled in pinyin as Zhān (詹). People with this surname include:

- Chan Chun-po (詹春柏; born 1941), Taiwanese Kuomintang politician
- Steve Chan (Taiwanese politician) (詹啟賢; born 1948), Taiwanese Kuomintang politician and physician
- Thomas Chan (詹順貴; born 1963), Taiwanese Green Party politician
- Chan Ya-wen (詹雅雯; born 1967), Taiwanese Hokkien pop singer
- Chan Yih-shin (詹益信; born 1977), Taiwanese golfer
- Faye Chan (詹雯婷; born 1981), Taiwanese singer
- Chan Chin-wei (詹謹瑋; born 1985), Taiwanese female tennis player
- Yako Chan (詹子晴; born 1988), Taiwanese singer and actress
- Chan Che-Yuan (詹哲淵; born 1989), Taiwanese football midfielder
- Chan Yung-jan (詹詠然; born 1989), Taiwanese tennis player
- Chan Hao-ching (詹皓晴; born 1993), Taiwanese tennis player, younger sister of Chan Yung-jan
- Chan Sheng-Yao (詹聖堯), Taiwanese Buddhist master and artist
- Chan Ting-I (詹婷怡), Taiwanese politician

== Mandarin Wade–Giles romanisation of 战/戰 ==
Chan is a Mandarin Wade–Giles romanisation (often used in Taiwan) of the surname spelled in pinyin as Zhàn (战/戰). People with this surname include:

- Elisa Chan (戰琬瑜), American politician in Texas

== Hokkien romanization of "田" ==
Chan is a romanisation of the surname spelled in pinyin as Tián (田). People with this surname include:

- Chan Seng Khai (田承凱; born 1953), Malaysian politician in Sarawak
- Jeremy Chan (田銘耀; born 1981), Singaporean actor and singer

== Other ==
- Angel Chan (disambiguation)
- Cynthia Chan, Filipino politician
- Jeffery Paul Chan (1942–2022), American writer and scholar
- Julius Chan (1939–2025), Papua New Guinean politician and Prime Minister
- Ken Chan (born 1993), Filipino actor
- Kenneth Chan (disambiguation)

== See also ==
- Chan (disambiguation)
- Chal (name)
- Char (name)
