= Chan =

Chan may refer to:

== Places ==
- Chan (commune), Cambodia
- Chan Lake, by Chan Lake Territorial Park in Northwest Territories, Canada

== People ==
- Chan Caldwell (1920–2000), Canadian football coach
- Chan Gailey (born 1952), American football coach
- Chan Kai-kit (born 1952), Macanese businessman
- Chan Reec Madut, South Sudanese jurist
- Chan Romero (1941–2024), American rock and roll performer
- Chan Santokhi (born 1959), Surinamese politician
- Ta Chan, nom de guerre of Cambodian war criminal Mam Nai
- Bang Chan (born 1997), Australian singer and producer of Korean descent, member of boy band Stray Kids
- Jan Franz Chan (born 1991), Filipino lawyer and politician
- Kang Yu-chan (born 1997), formerly known as Chan, Korean singer, member of boy band A.C.E

== Computing and media ==
- chan-, an abbreviation for channels in Internet Relay Chat (IRC)
- chan, a common suffix for the title of an imageboard

== As an acronym/initialism ==
- African Nations Championship or Championnat d'Afrique des Nations (CHAN), an African football tournament
- CHAN-DT, a TV station in Vancouver, Canada

== Other uses ==
- Chan (surname), romanization of various Chinese surnames
- Chan Buddhism, a school of Mahayana Buddhism
- Chan (honorific), a Japanese suffix which expresses endearment
- Chan (ฉันท์), a form of Thai poetry
- "Chans" (Kent song), a song by Swedish band Kent
- Chan, the plant Hyptis suaveolens, a relative of mint also known as "pignut"

== See also ==
- Chhan (disambiguation)
- Chen (surname), pronounced in Cantonese as Chan
- Chung (surname)
- Zen (disambiguation), Japanese Buddhist school originating from Chan Buddhism
- Dhyana (disambiguation), Indian Mahayana Buddhist school, origin of the Chan and Zen schools
