= Batuo =

First abbot of Shaolin Monastery

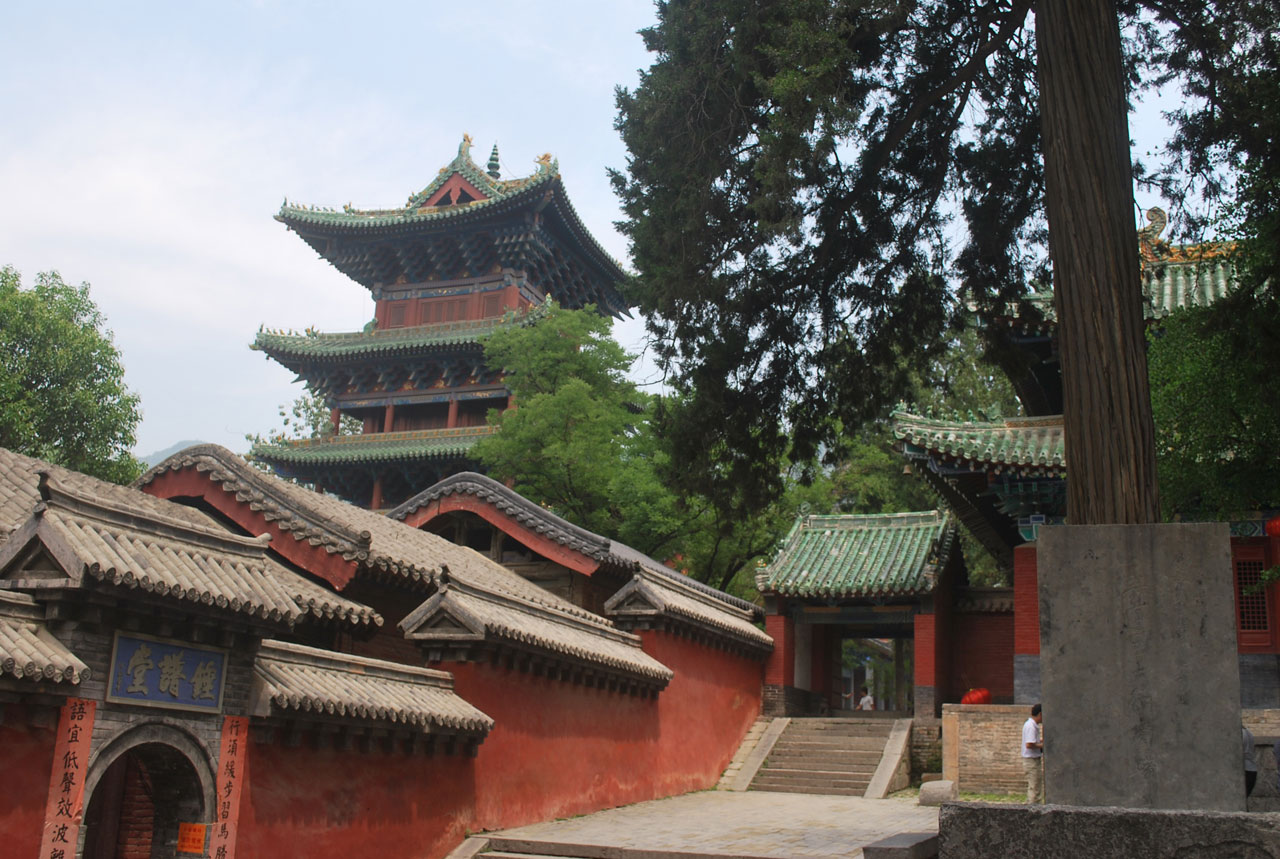
Main gate of the Shaolin temple in Henan.

The dhyana master Buddhabhadra (Chinese: 跋陀; pinyin: Bátuó) was an Indian monk and the first abbot of the Shaolin Monastery. Hailing from India, he traveled to China during the 5th century to propagate Buddhism and became a highly respected spiritual figure in the Northern Wei court.

== Biography ==
According to the Deng Feng County Recording, Bátuó arrived in China around 464 CE and preached for thirty years. He taught a form of Nikaya Buddhism that placed a heavy emphasis on strict monastic discipline (Vinaya) and deep meditation (dhyana). Bátuó was known for his mastery of meditation; the historical text Former Worthies Gather at the Mount Shuang-feng Stūpa and Each Talks of the Dark Principle contains the following reference to his philosophy: "Dhyana Master Buddha says: 'The extreme principle is wordless. The sagely mind is unimpeded.'"

Because of Bátuó's profound spiritual insight, he gained the deep respect and patronage of Emperor Xiaowen of Northern Wei. In 495 CE, thirty-one years after Bátuó's arrival in China, Emperor Xiaowen ordered the construction of the Shaolin Monastery specifically to house the master and provide a center for his teachings. The temple was built at the western foot of Mount Song in Henan Province. Bátuó served as the monastery's inaugural abbot, dedicating himself to translating scriptures and teaching the dharma to hundreds of followers.

== Disciples and Martial Arts Connection ==
Bátuó's teachings attracted numerous followers, but the most prominent among them were his disciples Sengchou (480–560) and Huiguang (487–536).

Historically, Bátuó and his disciples represent the earliest known connection between the Shaolin Monastery and Chinese martial arts predating the legendary arrival of Bodhidharma. Both Sengchou and Huiguang were renowned for their exceptional martial staff skills and combat prowess long before they fully dedicated their lives to monastic study under Bátuó. The physical conditioning and martial abilities of his disciples were integrated into their daily monastic lives, earning them mentions in the Chinese Buddhist canon.
