= Gillian Chan (disambiguation) =

Gillian Chan may refer to:

- Gillian Chan (born 1954), Canadian children's author
- Gillian Chan (model) (born 1994), Playboy Playmate of the Month for November 2019

== See also ==
- Chan (surname)
