= In My Heart =

In My Heart may refer to:

- In My Heart (2020 film), Malaysian Mandarin-language romance drama film
- In My Heart (Texas song)
- In My Heart (Moby song)
- "In My Heart", single by B. J. Thomas, Tim Krekel 1979
- "In My Heart", single by Barbara and the Browns, Steve Cropper, Deanie Parker, 1964
- "In My Heart", song by Cornell Campbell, 1977
- "In My Heart", single by Damita Jo, Rose Marie McCoy, Charles Singleton, 1955
- "In My Heart", single by Derrick Morgan, Prince Buster, 1962
- "In My Heart", single by Dianne Brooks, Harvey Brooks, 1967
- "In My Heart", song by Lou Rawls, J. W. Alexander, Sam Cooke 1961, Johnny Morisette 1960
- "In My Heart", song by The Maytals, 1968
- "In My Heart", single by Roy Castle, Tepper, Bennett, 1958; Carl Dobkins, Jr., 1960
- "In My Heart", song by Scott Garrett, Eisner, Weiss, 1958
