= Zen Wong =

Chinese singer, songwriter, and actress

- 俊倩
- Born: Zen Jun Qian; 30 July 1993 (age 33); Kuala Lumpur, Malaysia
- Education: Taylor's University Lakeside Campus in Malaysia, Bachelor's (HONS) degree in Mass Communication major in Broadcasting in addition to a minor in Advertising
- Occupations: Singer; Songwriter; Actress
- Years active: 2013–present
- Notable credit(s): A Better Us (2021); Missing You (2020); If I Knew (2019); Love (2016); You Were There (2016); Know Me (2013)

Chinese name
- Chinese: 俊倩
Transcriptions
Standard Mandarin
- Hanyu Pinyin: Jùn Qiàn
Yue: Cantonese
- Jyutping: Zeon3 Sin6
Southern Min
- Hokkien POJ: Chùn-chhiàn

Zen Wong (Chinese: 俊倩; born 30 July 1993), also known as Zen Jun Qian, is a Malaysian-born Chinese singer-songwriter, actress and an event planner. Graduated from Taylor's University Lakeside Campus in Malaysia with a Bachelor's (HONS) degree in Mass Communication major in Broadcasting in addition to a minor in Advertising. In 2013, Zen Wong, made her debut as a professional singer with her release of her first single "Know Me", which successfully drew attention from the local music industry and with her striking red hair image. In 2014, she won the "NEWAY Top 10 Local Hits Music Most Popularity Award" with her debut single "Know Me" at the "NEWAY Music Awards". She had also subsequently won the "People's Choice Most Outstanding New Artist Award" and the "Best Online Popularity Award".

In May 2015, she was invited to sing in the opening act for a famous American singer, Demi Lovato concert in Malaysia. Within two years of her debut, Zen has also delivered many notable achievements, including being shortlisted for the Best New Artist at the Malaysia PWH Music Award, the most iconic music award in the Malaysian music industry.

In addition, Zen has also started acting and starred in the web-film "Maybe, Goodbye". In 2018, she entered the acting industry when she was cast as the female lead in the Malaysian-Taiwanese Chinese film called "In My Heart" . The movie was released in 2020 in theatres in Malaysia, Singapore. China, Hong Kong and Taiwan. In 2020, Zen Wong also released her new singles called "Missing You", the movie theme song for the film "In My Heart"

In 2019, she released her first composition, "If I Knew", alongside reputable producer, Hanz Koay. In 2021, she released her full composition music titled, " A Better Us".

== Life and career ==
=== Early life ===
Growing up English educated, Zen communicated in English with her mother and minimal mandarin with her father. She had zero knowledge in Chinese characters until she took classes during her university times.

She joined the National Choir of Malaysia when she was 7 years old, where she gained her performance experience and passion in music.

In 2012, she competed in the China Eastern Association Etiquette Ambassador Competition, and won champion for Malaysia, and emerged second runner's up during the finals in Nanjing, China.

=== Career beginnings and debut album ===
In 2013, she was signed by a record label to become a recording artiste, and officially debuted with her first single "Know Me". After her debut, her journey as a singer did not go smoothly. She got cyber-bullied during her first few years in the industry. Fortunately, she did not gave up and continued her faith in music.

In 2014, Zen Wong won the "NEWAY Top 10 Local Hits Music Most Popular Music Award", "People's Choice Most Outstanding New Artist Award" and "Best Online Popularity Award" with her debut singles, "Know Me".

In May 2015, she was selected to perform for the opening of Demi Lovato's concert in Malaysia.

In the same year, she was shortlisted for Best New Artist in the Malaysia PWH Music Award 2015.

In 2016, her song "You Were There" with local singer Thomas Kok won the "NEWAY Top 10 Local Hits Music Video Award". In the same year, Zen Wong starred in the web-film "Maybe, Goodbye", and in 2018, she became the female lead in the Taiwanese - Malaysian Chinese movie named "In My Heart". The movie's theme song, "Missing You", is also performed by Zen Wong.

In 2019, she started her career as a songwriter, and for the first time, she worked with the local producer Hanz Koay to complete the lyrics and music for the song, "If I Knew". The song was written for her late friend artist Emily Kong, who died in a car accident earlier that year.

In 2021, she released her own composition called "A Better Us" to encourage people during the depression caused in the society from the COVID-19 pandemic.

In 2024, marking the 10th anniversary of their debut, Zen released Silently, a song composed by Jimmy Soo, aiming to remind listeners that "Tomorrow isn’t scary; what’s scary is not moving on from yesterday."

In 2025 after a six-month hiatus, Zen released Dream Fold, a comforting song about chasing dreams.

== Discography ==
- Know Me (2013) Single
- Love (2016) Love Story EP Album
- You Were There (2016) Love Story EP Album
- If I Knew (2019) Single
- Missing You (2020) Single
- A Better Us (2021) Single
- Silently (2024) Single
- Dream Fold (2025) Single

== Filmography ==
=== Film ===
Year	English title	Chinese title	Role	Notes
2016	Maybe, Goodbye	也许，再见	Cha Shao Mei	Leading Actress
2020	In My Heart	这⼀刻，想见你	Guai Shou	Leading Actress

== Awards and achievements ==
=== Music ===
Year	Event	Title	Song	Outcome
2014	NEWAY Music Awards	NEWAY Top 10 Local Hits Music Most Popularity Award	Know Me	Won
2014	NEWAY Music Awards	People's Choice Most Outstanding New Artist Award		Won
2014	NEWAY Music Awards	Best Online Popularity Award		Won
2015	Malaysia PWH Music Award	Best New Artist		Nominated
2016	NEWAY Music Awards	NEWAY Top 10 Local Hits Music Video Award	You Were There	Won
