= Chhan =

Chhan may refer to the following places:

India:

- Chhan, Bhopal, a village in Madhya Pradesh, India
- Chhan, Sawai Madhopur, a village in Rajasthan, India

Pakistan:

- Chhan, Abbottabad, a village in Abbottabad District, Pakistan

== See also ==
- Chan (disambiguation)
