= Rasiya =

Indian folk music from Braj region, Uttar Pradesh

- Cultural origins: Uttar Pradesh, India
- Typical instruments: Bhum Sarangi Dholak Harmonium

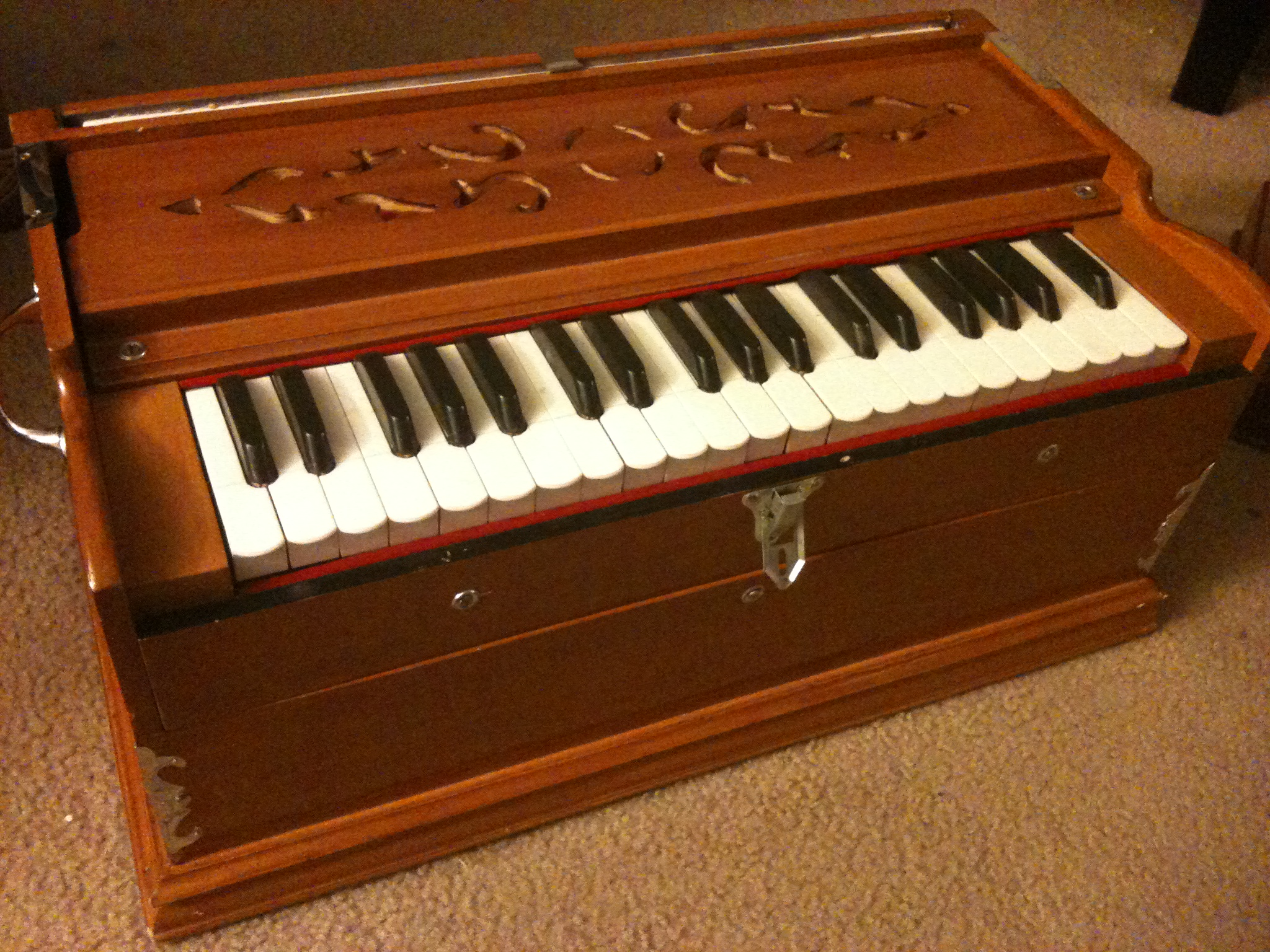
Harmonium

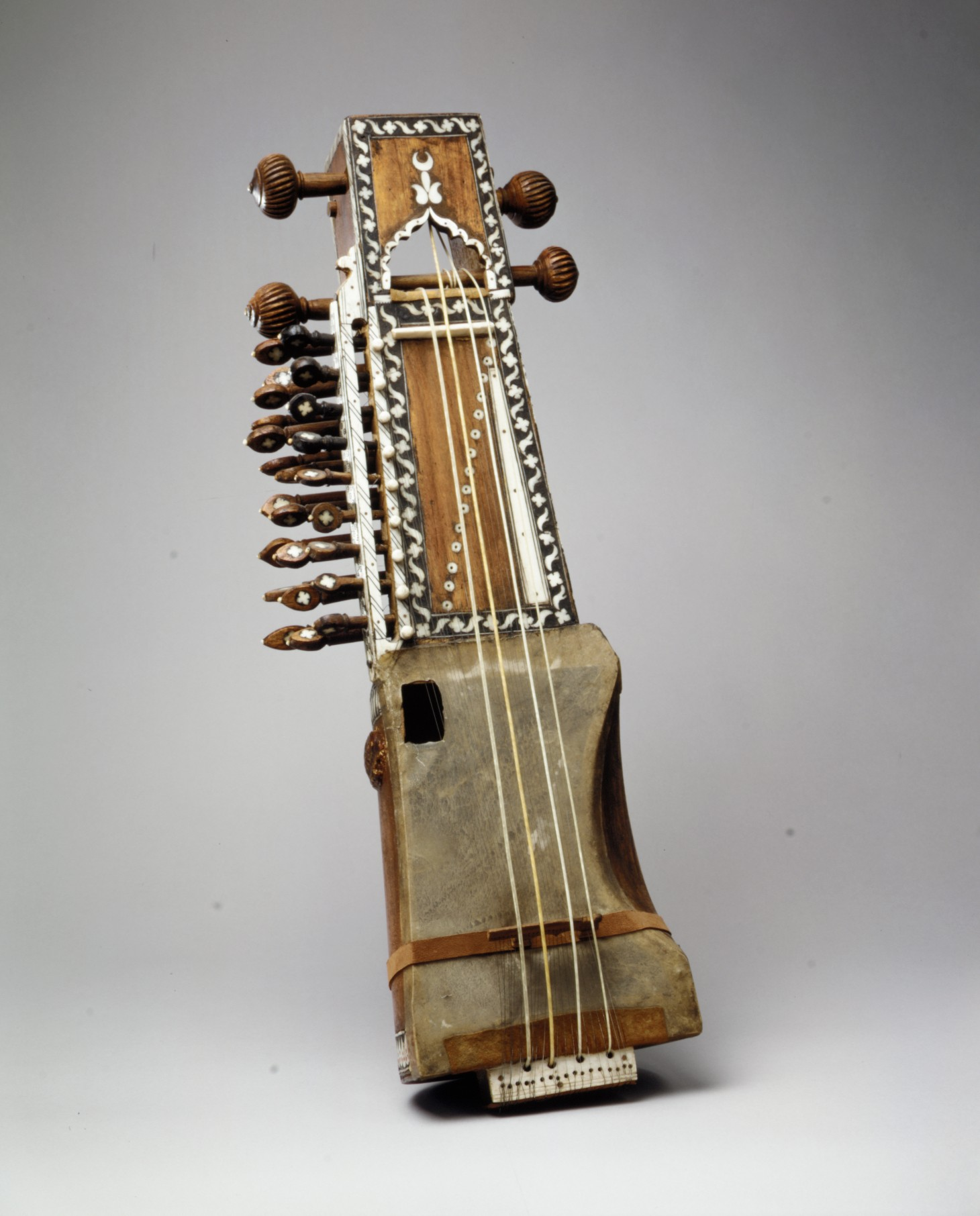
Sarangi

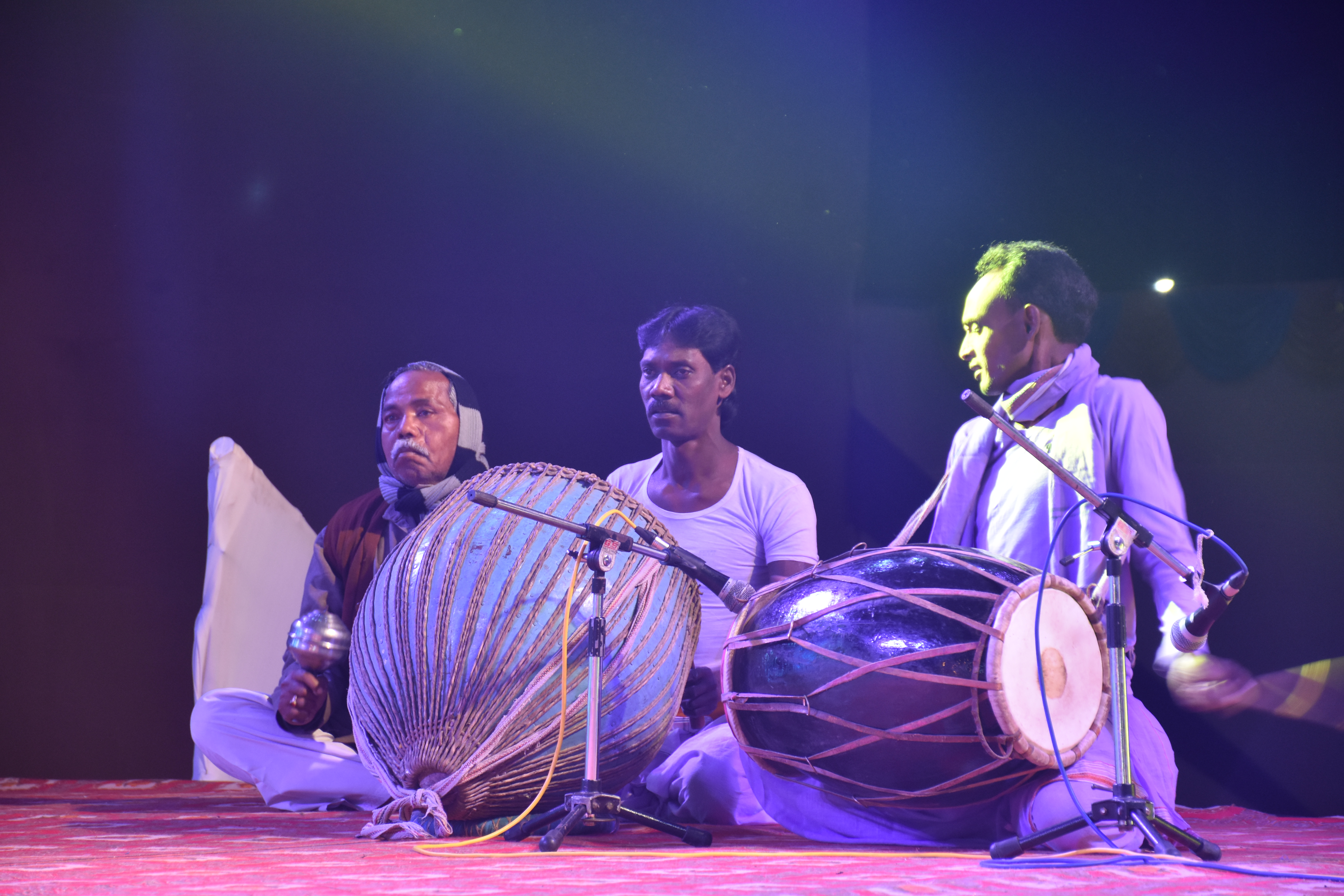
Dholak

Rasiya is a popular genre of Indian folk music from the Braj region of Uttar Pradesh. The style of rasiya consists of multiple sub genres and is performed in a variety of different contexts. The songs have been known to portray a wide range of topics however, they are most commonly sung to a set of stock tunes that often portrays the love of the Hindu god Krishna and goddess Radha. The term rasiya is the Hindi word for “epicure” which refers to the male suitors, or the god Krishna himself as depicted in the songs. Rasiya's are sung and typically played with a variety of instruments, the most common are the “dholak” drums, sarangi, and harmonium. This style of music is commonly associated with the popular ancient Hindu festival of Holi and is often performed by villagers, professional entertainers, as well as participants in temple song sessions.

== Characteristics ==
Rasiyas are characterised by a frequent use of a set of stock melodies which are used equally throughout the genre. There are around 20 stock melodies which are used in performing rasiya, for example, some of the names of these melodies include “tarz”, “bahr”, and “dhun”, however, other melodies, particularly in the sub-genre of hathrasi rasiya can also be encountered. Modern Rasiyas contain erotic lyrics and euphemisms while traditional Rasiyas are devotional portrayals of Radha and Krishna. They are most commonly sung in informal song meetings by members of the rural community in the Braj region of Uttar Pradesh. There are different variants and styles of rasiya's, and villagers will sing their own respective regional variants during their local festivities. During the Holi season, rasiyas are widely performed in temples. Rasiyas tend to encompass a traditional set of themes, however, the range of topics that the songs can be based on within the genre is limitless. Author Peter Manuel has argued that “to some extent, rasiya is distinguished by its characteristic melodies, styles, and contexts rather than text content, and is thus able to accommodate any sort of text topic”.

== Variations of Rasiya ==
=== Religious Rasiya ===
There are a few different forms of rasiyas that are performed. The first are religious rasiyas, these are commonly played during the festival of Holi portraying the love of the Hindu gods Radha and Krishna. They are frequently written from the female perspective of Radha and portray Krishna and his flirtation with her. The lyrics are very much set in tradition and do not contain any references to modern entities (e.g. cars, refrigerators, fans) unlike the other variations of Rasiya.

=== Secular Rasiya ===
Equally as popular as religious rasiyas, non-religious or secular rasiyas are also widely written and presented from the female perspective, these tend to involve erotic language and commonly revolve around a young wife who is addressing her husband or lover. In secular rasiyas, the male lover can still be interpreted as Krishna regardless of whether the lyrics mention the god Krishna or not. In these secular rasiyas the convictions of the female protagonist towards her lover are often ambivalent, a mixture of desire, shame, and anxiety. There is a significant amount of overlap between krishnaite and secular love in both rasiyas as well as amatory Hindi poetry. Both religious and secular rasiyas display similarities with the portrayal Krishna and the male suitor. Typically, they are portrayed as caring, flirtatious, desirable, but also somewhat frustrating. However, one of the differences between the two types are in the lyrics used. Secular rasiyas are often heard referencing modern entities as opposed to religious rasiyas.

=== Languriya ===
Another form of rasiya is that of the sub-genre of “lānguriya”. As a sub-genre, lānguriyas differ from the typical rasiya as they are most commonly sung in just two or three stock melodies. They have a somewhat loose association with the Hindu goddess Kaila Devi whose temple is located southwest of the city of Agra. The genre is named after a lānguriya which is often thought of as a guard or assistant to the goddess Kaila Devi. However, the lānguriya lacks any formal scriptural representation, as such this individual can be represented in any manner “(eg., a boy, a lover, or a junior male divinity to Kaila Devi)” . It is common that the lyrics will portray a young woman speaking to the lānguriya. As well as being a supernatural being the lānguriya can also be represented as “an annoying suitor, a mischievous child, a lecherous bachelor, a fellow devotee or simply her husband or lover”. Similarly, to secular rasiyas the authors of lānguriyass also keep the lyrics contemporary with the songs often containing a wide use of modernisms. It has been argued by author Peter Manuel that because of the inflexibility of religious rasiyas (whose lyrics are very much stuck in tradition), the sub-genres of secular rasiya and lānguriya which allow for greater lyrical flexibility, have strongly contributed to their present popularity.

=== Hathrasi Rasiya ===
Hathrasi rasiya is another sub-genre of rasiya named after the Hathras city. It is performed by semi-professional members of music clubs known as Akharas. It is also “patronised by local elites and enjoyed by music connoisseurs as well as members from various different social classes". According to author Peter Manuel “it is informed by a complex set of prosodic schemes, with secondary melodic aspects”, these schemes involve elements of music theory. “Whilst rasiya and the closely related genre languriyā, aside from their traditional forms, constitute the main genres of Braj commercial folk-pop music. Hathrasi rasiya has evolved as a particularly elaborate form within the broader category of Braj rasiya".

==== Rasiya Akharas ====
Akharas are voluntary social gatherings of singers and poets who host performances of rasiya. They are open to men of all social castes and religions though they mainly involve Hindus. Usually the akharas will charge a fee for their performances of rasiya. The akhara's have specific structures with individuals holding prescribed roles and various different titles. The most important figure is known as the ustad who are performers able to improvise to a high standard, and are well educated in mythology, history and speech rhythm. The ustad is elected by the members of the akhara and a ceremony is held where he is gifted a special turban. The ustad will usually write poetry for the performances in his spare time however, the akhara also has a designated poet known as the kavi who will assist the ustad. The role of the director and organiser falls under the role of the khalifa as the director and organises the programmes and deals with the akharas patrons as well as other duties. Generally, in akharas the verses are sung by the lead singer, though this role can also overlap with the ustad's. Much of the singing takes place in the upper registers so the lead singer must have a powerful voice, this enables him to be heard in different settings and scenarios where amplification is not available. The rest of the members of the akharas are chorus members, they will complete the lead singers verses by shouting out last word. The akharas will often be accompanied by a dancer known as a janana who provides a visual element to the performances as well as instrumentalists. It is common for the instrumentalists to play a variety of instruments such as the harmonium, dholak, dol tasha, nagara, and clarinet.

==== Origins ====
Like other regional vernacular styles of music, the emergence of hathrasi rasiya is somewhat unclear. Some speculate that it originated from the town of Deeg north west of Agra. Others propose that its origin came from four friends, Lallu, Bhajna, Nattha and Chiranji, after visiting the town of Bharatpur near Deeg for a festival. At the festival they were inspired after encountering local rasiya singing. After returning to Hathras they formed two akharas inviting other musical enthusiasts to partake. From the 1890s other rasiya akharas were created which proliferated allowing the genre to evolve into its own distinctive form. To formulate lyrics the singers used resources from literary circles revolving around Sanskrit and classical Braj-basha poetry. Hathrasi rasiya also took inspiration from multiple forms of akharas, in particular those dedicated to wrestling known as Kushti. Folk song such as jhulna, lavni and khyal, as well as folk theatre (Turra-Kalagi) also had significant influence. Jhulna, lavni and Turra-Kalagi were commonly characterised by a duel between rival akharas. Hathrasi rasiya borrowed this concept of the duel between rival akharas leading to the creation of rasiya akharas. Rasiya akharas improved their art by borrowing from local music styles such as regional rasiya tunes and melodies from neighbouring towns and regions.

Proliferation

During the early 1900s jhulna lavni and Turra-Kalagi folk song as well as wrestling akharas declined whilst rasiya akharas spread. In the town of Hathras there are a number of public and private gardens in which citizens would often congregate. This contributed a significant part of cultural life throughout the Braj region with local elites sponsoring their performances. Local elites or gentry also supported akharas by providing meeting spaces or clubhouses in which rasiya battles (dangals) would take place. By the 1950s akharas had proliferated and had been established in neighbouring towns such as Aligarh, Mathura, and Agra. The most successful period for hathrasi rasiya was in the mid-20th century where an estimated 70 akharas were operating in the region, these groups ranged in skill and fame.

== Formats and popularity ==
The advent of vernacular language printing in the mid-19th century saw the Braj music of Northern India significantly rise in popularity as it allowed for music to be more widely accessed and distributed. The cassette boom in the 1980s saw rasiyas and particularly the sub-genre of lānguriya further increase in popularity within the Braj region. With cassette technology, cassettes of lānguriya songs were among the first created which were widely sold at Melas (festivals or fairs) and temples. The increasing demand for fresh cassette material also encouraged a significant amount of creativity for the genre, most significantly the variety containing sexually explicit lyrics. The introduction of the VCD around the year 2000 incorporated a new visual dimension to music, this visual element was also added to many commercial Languriya recordings. Many cassette companies quickly switched to the new VCD technology with the city of Agra quickly establishing itself as a hub for media production. The technological advances seen with the advent of Cassettes, VCDs and DVDs allowed the Braj regions internal music market to thrive. In addition local rasiya singers often performed on radio station such as “All India Radio” based in the city of Mathura also gained in popularity. However, in comparison the music scene of the Braj region is not as popular as its Bhojpuri and Punjabi counterparts which have "experienced a cultural renaissance". In terms of pan-Indian recognition traditional Krishnaite rasiyas have been the only genre of rasiya to enjoy widespread Indian appeal due to their religious nature. The 21st century saw further technological advances for music in the region with the USB and the mobile phone becoming easily accessible and exploding in popularity. These technologies allowed for large quantities of music on a single device. However, many of the local production companies that produced rasiya music and its sub genres had shut down for a variety of reasons such as piracy, tax evasion, and violation of censorship laws resulting in significantly less output of Braj folk music. Producers of rasiya have adapted to 21st century technologies and have uploaded their music to online streaming through Indian services such as Gaana, Saavn, Musicindiaonline and YouTube for recognition and self-promotion.
