= Chaube =

Brahmin subcaste

Chaube Brahmins are a group of Brahmins found in Northern India. In the Braj region, they serve as pilgrimage priests. They are also notable for their wrestling culture and masti way of life. The Hindi term caube is inherited from the Sanskrit caturvēda ("containing the 4 Vedas").
