= Puja =

Puja or Pooja may refer to:

== Religion ==
- Puja (Hinduism), a ritual of devotional worship, to host and honour a guest, or one to celebrate an event
- Puja (Buddhism), expressions of honour, worship and devotional attention
- Puja, a wooden stick, sometimes leather-covered, used to play a singing bowl

== People ==
- Pooja Banerjee (born 1991), Indian television actress
- Pooja Bhatt (born 1972), Bollywood producer, director and actress
- Puja Banerjee, Indian television actress
- Pooja Gandhi, Indian film actress
- Pooja Hegde, Indian actress
- Pooja Jatyan (born 1998), Indian para archer
- Pooja Pal (alternate spelling Puja Pal), Indian politician from the Bahujan Samaj Party
- Pooja Shah (born 1979), British television actress
- Pooja Singh, Indian television actress
- Pooja Umashankar, Indian actress
- Puja Gupta, winner of Miss India Universe in 2007
- Frigyes Puja (1921–2008), native form Puja Frigyes, Hungarian politician
- Miss Pooja, (born 1980) (real name Gurinder Kaur Kainth), Indian singer

== Other uses ==
- Puja, Nepal, a town in the Rapti Zone of central south-western Nepal
- Pooja Naberrie, a fictional character in the Star Wars universe
- Pooja (1940 film), a 1940 Hindi/Urdu psychological drama film
- Pooja (1967 film), a 1967 Indian Malayalam film
- Pooja (1975 film), a 1975 Telugu Romantic musical film
- Pooja, a 2010 film directed by Deepak Rauniyar
- Pooja "Poo" Sharma, a character in the 2001 Indian film Kabhi Khushi Kabhi Gham, played by Kareena Kapoor
