= Shahan =

Shahan may refer to:

== Places ==
- Shahan, West Virginia
- Shahan District, in Yemen

== People ==
- Robert R. Shahan (born 1939), American bishop
- Shahan Natalie (1884–1983), Armenian politician and activist
- Shahan Shahnour (1903-1974), French-Armenian writer and poet
- Shirley Shahan, American drag racer
- Thomas Joseph Shahan (1857–1932), American Roman Catholic theologian and educator
- Shahan Ali Mohsin, Indian race driver

== See also ==
- Chahan (disambiguation)
