= Charkula =

Type of Indian dance

Charkula is a dance performed in the Braj region of Uttar Pradesh.

In this dance, veiled women balancing large multi-tiered circular wooden pyramids on their heads dance to songs about Krishna. Each pyramid has 108 lighted oil lamps arranged in a spiral. It is specially performed on the third day after Holi. It is believed that on that day Radha was born.

According to legend, Radha's grandmother ran out of the house with the charkula on her head to announce the birth of Radha, Since then, Charkula has formed a popular dance form of Brajbhoomi, performed during various festivities.

Every aspect of the culture of the Braj region of Uttar Pradesh is associated with Lord Krishna. So it happened with the Charkula dance as well – a folk dance of the Braj area, which has also found its origin in the Krishna legend. It is believed that the Charkula dance celebrates the happy victory over Indra by Krishna and the cowherd community of Braj. This dance, therefore, became a symbol of happiness as well as joyful rapture. Krishna raised the mount Goverdhan and as if to re-enact the Govardhan Leela the dancing damsel of Braj raises the 50 Kilo Charkula on her head while performing the Charkula dance.

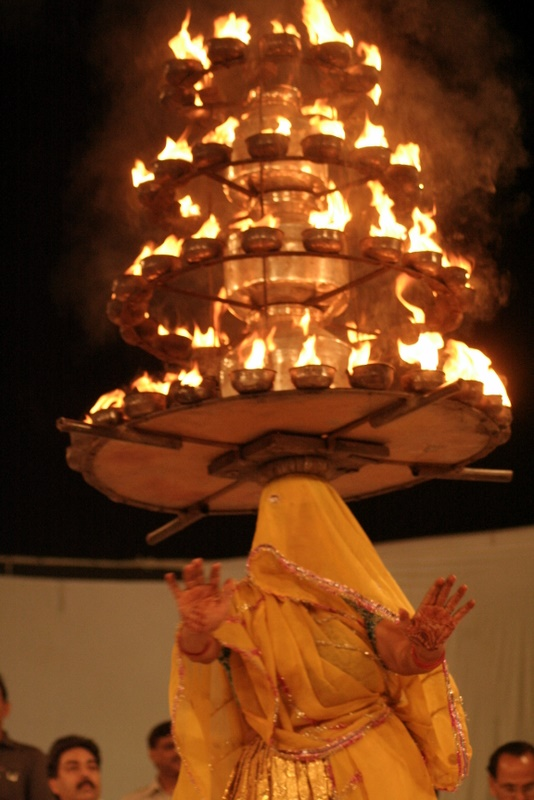
Charkula Dance
