= Xen (disambiguation) =

Xen is a hypervisor allowing multiple computer operating systems to execute on the same computer hardware concurrently.

Xen may also refer to:

- Xen, a programming language, now part of Cω
- Xen (Half-Life), a fictional location of the computer game Half-Life
- Xen (album), by Arca, 2014
- XEN-AM, radio station in Mexico

== People ==
- Xen C. Scott (1882–1924), American sports coach
- Xen Balaskas (1910–1994), South African cricketer

== See also ==
- Xen Cuts, a compilation album from the record label Ninja Tune
- Xenharmonic music, music using a tuning system other than standard 12-tone equal temperament
- Xem
- Zen (disambiguation)
