= Jannie Chan =

Singaporean entrepreneur

Jannie Chan Siew Lee DSAP
- 曾秀丽
- Other name: Jannie Tay
- Education: Monash University (B.Sc., M.Sc.)
- Occupation: Entrepreneur

Jannie Chan Siew Lee (曾秀丽), also known by her married name, Jannie Tay, is a Singaporean entrepreneur and former president of the Singapore Retailers Association and the ASEAN Business Forum, in both cases the first woman to hold the position.

== Biography ==
Chan earned a B.Sc. in physiology and an M.Sc. in pharmacology from Monash University in 1968 and 1971, and was a lecturer in both subjects at the National University of Singapore.

In 1979, she co-founded The Hour Glass Limited, a luxury watch retailer, with her husband, Henry Tay. As of 2015, it had 41 stores in several countries; she was formerly executive vice-president and executive vice-chairman.

She founded the holding company Save Our Planet Investments (Hypha Holdings, 2005) and the non-profit Save Our Planet Foundation (2007), which works for reforestation to mitigate climate change. Her most recent company is Scientific Tradition Pte Ltd, which develops mushroom products based on traditional Chinese medicine.

Chan contributed to the 2006 book, Six Billion Minds: Managing Outsourcing in the Global Knowledge Economy. She is the first female president of the Singapore Retailers Association and of the ASEAN Business Forum, the first female executive board member of the Commonwealth Business Council and founder chairman of the Commonwealth Business Women Leaders' Network. She also serves on the first Business Advisory Council of the United Nations Office for Project Services (since 2000) and on the Business Advisory Council of the United Nations Economic and Social Commission for Asia and the Pacific (since 2004). She is active for women's rights: she was one of the organisers of the first Women Inspire exposition and business forum in Singapore in 2002 and was president of the Singapore chapter of WOW (Women for Other Women).

On 20 June 2019, Chan was declared bankrupt by the Singapore court for owing a moneylender over S$4 million in unpaid debt.

Chan began serving a two-week prison sentence for contempt of court on 9 September 2019, after losing her appeal against a 2017 sentence judgment.

On 15 October 2019, the Singapore High Court rules that Chan's forced sale of $3.85m apartment to be paid to Official Assignee.

== Personal life ==
Chan is of Hakka Chinese heritage; her father and grandfather were "sinsehs" (practitioners of traditional medicine). She has six siblings, four of whom became physicians.

Chan and her husband have three children, Audrey, Michael (who now manages The Hour Glass) and Sabrina. Their first child died in childhood. They divorced in 2010.

== Awards ==
- 1989: Special Volunteer Award, Community Chest of Singapore
- 1996: Louis Feraud Les Honours award (Business category)
- 1999: Honorary doctorate, Oxford Brookes University
- 1997: Leading Women Entrepreneurs of the World award, Paris
- 2003: Darjah Sultan Ahmad Shah Pahang, carrying the title Dato'
- 2003: Distinguished Alumni Award, Monash University
- 2009: APEA Woman Entrepreneur of the Year award, Enterprise Asia
- 2011 Lifetime Achievement for Outstanding Contribution to Tourism. Presented at Singapore Experience Awards.

== Key positions held ==
- 1990: President, Women for Other Women Association (WOW)
- 1997–1998: Director, International Women's Forum Leadership Foundation
- 1997–1999: Board Member, Women's Leadership Initiative Board, John F Kennedy School of Government, Harvard University
- 1998: President, ASEAN Business Forum
- Jul 1999–Jul 2016: President, Singapore Retailers Association
- 2002: President, Women’s Business Connection
- 2002: Chairperson, Commonwealth Business Women Leaders network
- 2003: Founding member and Chairman, Retail Academy of Singapore
- 2004: Chairman, Retail Industry Skills and Training Council
- 2004: Member, United Nations ESCAP Business Advisory Council
- 2011: Chairman, Asia-Pacific Retailers Association
