= Chhan, Bhopal =

Chhan Chan
- village
- Location within Madhya Pradesh Location within India
- Coordinates: 23.147206°N 77.499404°E
- Country: India
- State: Madhya Pradesh
- District: Bhopal
- Tehsil: Huzur

Population (2011)
  - Total: 1,718
- Time zone: UTC+5:30 (IST)
- ISO 3166 code: MP-IN
- Census code: 482556

Chhan is a village in the Bhopal district of Madhya Pradesh, India. It is located in the Huzur tehsil and the Phanda block. The Institute of Professional Education and Research is located near this village.

== Demographics ==
According to the 2011 census of India, Chhan has 415 households. The effective literacy rate (i.e. the literacy rate of population excluding children aged 6 and below) is 85.78%.

Demographics (2011 Census)
	Total	Male	Female
Population	1718	935	783
Children aged below 6 years	248	145	103
Scheduled caste	239	132	107
Scheduled tribe	73	34	39
Literates	1261	709	552
Workers (all)	615	498	117
Main workers (total)	598	490	108
Main workers: Cultivators	68	59	9
Main workers: Agricultural labourers	62	47	15
Main workers: Household industry workers	12	12	0
Main workers: Other	456	372	84
Marginal workers (total)	17	8	9
Marginal workers: Cultivators	1	1	0
Marginal workers: Agricultural labourers	6	1	5
Marginal workers: Household industry workers	0	0	0
Marginal workers: Others	10	6	4
Non-workers	1103	437	666
