= Bachhgaon =

Village in Uttar Pradesh, India

- Village
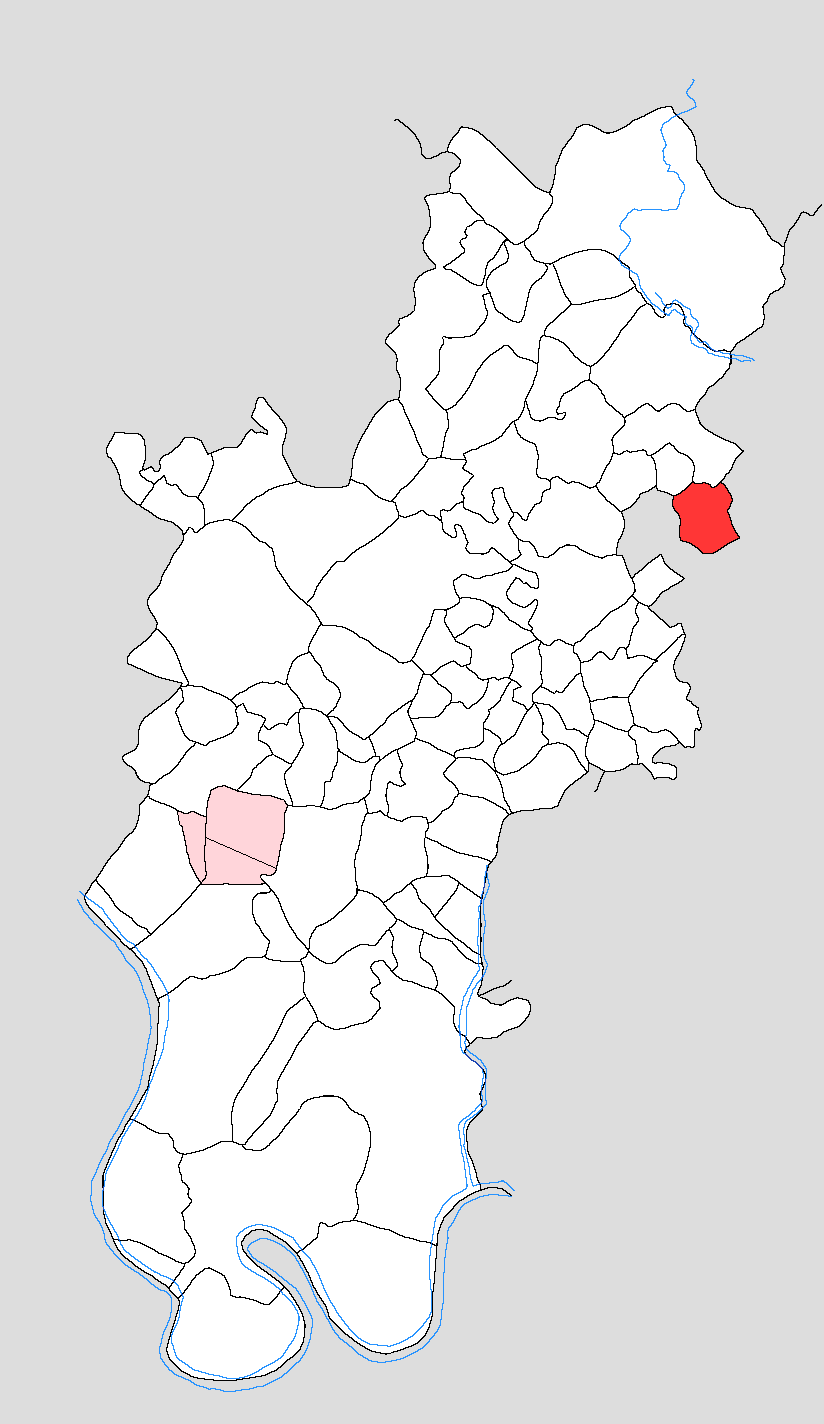
- Map showing Bachhgaon in Tundla block

- Location in Uttar Pradesh, India
- Coordinates: 27.29767°N 78.36515°E
- Country: India
- State: Uttar Pradesh
- District: Firozabad
- Tehsil: Tundla

Area
  - Total: 2.691 km^{2} (1.039 sq mi)

Population (2011)
  - Total: 5,044
  - Density: 1,874/km^{2} (4,855/sq mi)
- Time zone: UTC+5:30 (IST)
- PIN: 283204

Bachhgaon (Bachhgā̃v) is a village in Tundla block of Firozabad district, Uttar Pradesh. As of 2011, it has a population of 5,044, in 819 households.

== Demographics ==
As of 2011, Bachhgaon had a population of 5,044, in 819 households. This population was 53.2% male (2,683) and 46.8% female (2,361). The 0-6 age group numbered 740 (403 male and 337 female), making up 14.7% of the total population. 1,287 residents were members of Scheduled Castes, or 25.5% of the total.

The 1981 census recorded Bachhgaon as having a population of 2,746 people (1,532 male and 1,214 female), in 496 households and 437 physical houses. It was then counted as part of Kotla block.

The 1961 census recorded Bachhgaon (as "Bachh Gaon") as comprising 1 hamlet, with a total population of 1,982 people (1,033 male and 949 female), in 339 households and 217 physical houses. The area of the village was given as 670 acres and it had a hospital and post office at that point. It was then counted as part of Kotla block.

== Infrastructure ==
As of 2011, Bachhgaon had 4 primary schools and 1 community health centre. Drinking water was provided by tap and hand pump; there were no public toilets. The village had a sub post office but no public library; there was at least some access to electricity for all purposes. Streets were made of both kachcha and pakka materials.
