= Kamai, Uttar Pradesh =

Village in Uttar Pradesh, India

Kamai is a village in the Indian state of Uttar Pradesh. It is located in Goverdhan tehsil of Mathura district, and in the 2011 census its population was 6,916.
