= Varshney =

Indian family name

Varshney (वार्ष्णेय) is an Indian surname and a community. Alternative names for the group include Barahseni and Bara-Saini. They belong to Bania caste and were traditionally traders and substantial landowners.

== Notable people ==
- Alka Nupur Varshney (born 1957), Kathak dancer and former actress
- Ashutosh Varshney (born 1957), American political scientist
- Ishwar Das Varshnei (died 1948), called "father of the glass industry" in India
- Rajeev Kumar Varshney (born 1973), Director, Centre of Excellence in Genomics at ICRISAT
- Umesh Varshney (born 1957), molecular biologist
- Y. P. Varshni (born 1932), physicist

Fictional characters

- Anil Varshney in the 2012 novel The Krishna Key
- Rahul Varshney and Kala Varshney in the 2014 film Ugly
