= Zen (disambiguation) =

Zen is a school of Mahāyāna Buddhism.

Zen may also refer to:

== Arts, entertainment and media ==
=== Fictional entities ===
- Zen, a computer in Blake's 7
- Aurelio Zen, in books by Michael Dibdin
- Zen the Intergalactic Ninja, in Zen comic books
- Zen, in Jacqueline Wilson's novel The Suitcase Kid

=== Film and television ===
- Zen (2009 film), a biography of Zen master Dogen
- Zen (2007 film), a drama-horror film
- Zen (TV series), 2011, based on Dibdin's novels

=== Games ===
- Zen Pinball, a game for the PlayStation
- Zen: Intergalactic Ninja (video game), 1993

=== Music ===
- Zen (Chinese band), from Hong Kong
- Zen (Dutch band), a rock band
- Zen (DJ Krush album), 2001
- Zen (Zazie album), 1995
- Zen: The Music of Fred Katz, 1957
- "Zen" (X Ambassadors, K.Flay, and Grandson song), 2020
- "Zen" (Jennie song), 2025
- "Zen", a song by Anitta from the 2013 album Anitta
- "Zen", a song by Band-Maid from the 2025 EP Scooooop

== Businesses and organizations ==
- Zen (department store), formerly in Thailand and China
- Zen Internet, an English Internet service provider
- Zen (restaurant), a Japanese restaurant located in Markham, Ontario
- Zen Studios, a Hungarian video game developer

== People ==
- Zen Cho (fl from 2015), Malaysian-born fantasy author
- Zen Chong (born 1978), Malaysian-born actor
- Zen Gesner (born 1970), American actor
- Zen Kajihara (born 1966), Japanese actor
- Zen Luzniak, American soccer player
- Zen Jun Qian (born 1993), known as Zen Wong, Malaysian-born Chinese singer-songwriter and actress
- Joseph Zen (born 1932), Chinese Catholic prelate
- Kai Zen (actress) (born 2012), American actress
- Lezley Zen (born 1974), American pornstar
- Reniero Zeno (died 1268), or Renieri Zen, 45th Doge of Venice

== Science and technology ==
- Zen (microarchitecture), a family of computer processor microarchitectures from AMD
  - Zen (first generation), the first generation of the microarchitecture, often referred to as Zen 1 to distinguish between the series and the first generation
- Zen (recommendation system), a Russian information filtering system
- Zen (software), a Go playing engine
- Actian Zen, a database management system
- Creative Zen, a series of portable media players
- Zen (portable media player), 2007
- Zen, symbol for Zerknüllt, a gene in Drosophila
- Zen Browser, a fork of Mozilla Firefox
- Zearalenone, mycotoxin produced by Fusarium

== Other uses ==
- ZEN (Palermo) (Zona Espansione Nord), a quarter in Palermo, Sicily, Italy
- ZEN (professional wrestling), a professional wrestling stable
- Zen, an alternate title for god Zeus
- Maruti Suzuki Zen, a car
- Chen (surname), romanized as Zen in Wu Chinese

== See also ==
- Xen (disambiguation)
- Chan Buddhism, the Chinese school of Buddhism from which Zen derives
- Dhyana in Buddhism
- ZENN, an electric vehicle
