= Dhyana =

Dhyana may refer to:

== Meditative practices in Indian religions ==
- Dhyana in Buddhism (Pāli: jhāna)
- Dhyana in Hinduism
- Jain Dhyāna, see Jain meditation

== Other ==
- Dhyana, a work by British composer John Tavener (1944–2013)
- Dhyana, an album released in 2011, by the Dutch symphonic death metal band MaYaN
- Hygon Dhyana, a x86 compatible microprocessor
- Vidya Pradeep, also Dhyana, Indian actress

== See also ==
- Chan (disambiguation), Chinese Buddhist school from dhyana in Sanskrit
- Zen (disambiguation), Japanese Buddhist school deriving from Chan
- Dhyan, an Indian actor
