= Chahan, Iranshahr =

Chahan چاهان
- Village
- Location within Iran
- Coordinates: 27°25′13″N 60°50′03″E
- Country: Iran
- Province: Sistan and Baluchestan
- County: Iranshahr
- Bakhsh: Central
- Rural District: Damen

Population (2006)
  - Total: 166
- Time zone: UTC+3:30 (IRST)
  - Summer (DST): UTC+4:30 (IRDT)

Chahan (Persian: چاهان, also Romanized as Chāhān) is a village in Damen Rural District, in the Central District of Iranshahr County, Sistan and Baluchestan Province, Iran. At the 2006 census, its population was 166, in 28 families.
