= Puja, Nepal =

Village Development Committee in Mid-Western, Nepal

Puja पुजाँ
- Village Development Committee
- Location in Nepal
- Coordinates: 28.24°N 82.99°E
- Country: Nepal
- Region: Mid-Western
- Zone: Rapti Zone
- District: Pyuthan District
- VDC: Punjan

Population (2001 Census)
  - Total: 3,871
- 793 households
- Time zone: UTC+5:45 (Nepal Time)

Pujan is a town and Village Development Committee in Pyuthan, a Middle Hills district of Rapti Zone, western Nepal.

== Villages in this VDC ==
		Ward	Lat.	Lon	Elev.
Baglibang	बाग्लीबाङ	3	28°15'N	82°59'E	2,010m
Baglidanda	बाग्लीडाँडा		28°15'N	82°58'E	2,130
Chhewagaun	छेवगाउँ		28°15'N	82°59'E	1,710
Dandakatti	डाँडाकट्टी		28°14'N	82°58'E	2,010
Dhanmuda	धनबुडा		28°13'N	82°59'E	1,650
Gaunphata	गाउँफाटा		28°13'N	83°00'E	1,455
Gothanti	गोठाँटी		28°13'N	82°58'E	1,049
Halhale	हलहले		28°14'N	82°59'E	2,110
Jadagaun	जाडगाउँ		28°15'N	83°00'E	1,710
Jemarkatta	जेमरकट्टा		28°13'N	83°00'E	1,310
Kalle	कल्ले		28°14'N	83°01'E	1,239
Kaphalbas	काफलबास	1	28°13'N	83°01'E	1,425
Khalachaur	खलचौर	8	28°13'N	82°58'E	1,815
Khasibang	खसीबाङ		28°14'N	82°59'E	1,790
Kholabang	खोलाबाङ	4	28°14'N	82°59'E	2,002
Kolchaur	कोलचौर		28°13'N	83°01'E	1,535
Laishara	लैस्वाँरा	9	28°14'N	82°58'E	1,955
Lamtinge	लामटिङ्गे		28°13'N	82°59'E	1,610
Liwase	लिवासे	1	28°14'N	83°01'E	1,190
Mukhya Pokhara	मुख्य पखरा		28°13'N	83°00'E	1,350
Okhreni	ओख्रेनी		28°15'N	83°00'E	1,918
Pasabang	पासाबाङ		28°14'N	82°59'E	1,790
Phalante	फलाँटे	1	28°14'N	83°01'E	1,190
Phapreta	फप्रेटा		28°14'N	82°58'E	1,930
Phorsakharka	फोर्साखर्क	1	28°14'N	83°01'E	1,405
Puja	पुजाँ	1	28°13'N	83°00'E	1,651
Raghuwa	रघुवा		28°14'N	83°02'E	1,470
Sasibang	सासीबाङ		28°14'N	83°00'E	1,450
Thokresa	ठोक्रेसा	1	28°13'N	83°01'E	1,225
