= Kenneth Chan =

Kenneth Chan may refer to:

- Ken Chan (Filipino actor) (born 1993), Filipino-Chinese actor
- Ken Chan (composer), Hong Kong composer on films such as Naked Weapon
- Kenneth Chan Kai-tai (born 1964), Hong Kong actor
- Kenneth Chan Ka-lok (born 1968), chairman of the Hong Kong Civic Party from 2011 to 2012
- Kenneth Chan (rower) (born 1974), Australian rowing coxswain

== See also ==
- Kato-chan Ken-chan Gokigen TV, a Japanese TV variety show
