= Ahiwasi =

Brahmin caste in India

Ahiwasi Brahmin, sometimes spelt Ahivasi, is a Brahmin caste found in the states of Haryana, Uttar Pradesh, Rajasthan, Maharashtra and Madhya Pradesh in India.

== Origin of the Ahiwasi Brahmans (Saubhari Brahmans) ==
The Ahiwasi take their name from the Sanskrit ahi meaning dragon and was meaning dwelling, and their name means those who come from the abode of the dragon. They are said to have gotten this name on account of their association with Rishi Saubhari, who is said to have provided sanctuary to dragons at the village of Sunrakh, in what is now Mathura District. The Ahiwasi claim to be descendants of the Saubhari Rishi and 50 daughters of Mandhata. Historically, the Ahiwasi Brahmans were involved in the carrying trade, transporting salt from Rajasthan to other parts of North India. This led to settlements of the caste in the Narmada valley. In Madhya Pradesh, according to the traditions of the caste, Ahiwasi Brahmans are descended from a Brahman father and 50 Kshatriya mother.

== Customs, Language and traditions ==
The Ahiwasi Brahman (Saubhari Brahman) are strictly endogamous, and practice clan exogamy. There clans are known as gotras, and they are divided into 50 such gotras.

The Ahiwasi Brahmans are medium and big-sized farmers, who also have been involved in priestly duties. Trade remains an important secondary occupation. In Uttar Pradesh, they are still found mainly in Mathura District, 12 villages with 13th town Baldev (Dauji city) with a second settlement in Aligarh, Hathras, Noida, Agra, Bareilly, Ghaziabad and Saharanpur etc. while those in Madhya Pradesh are found mainly in Jabalpur District and Gwalior, Bhind, Hoshangabad, Harda, as well settlements in the Narmada River valley. in Rajsthan Bharatpur, Alwar and Jaipur, Haryan Karnal, Panipat, and many villages in south Karnataka and Kerala states. All Ahiwasi Brahmans (Saubhari Brahman) have been settled from Sunrakh village Vrindavan, uttar pradesh.
