= Chahan, Kerman =

Chahan چاهان
- Village
- Location within Iran
- Coordinates: 26°42′31″N 58°51′29″E
- Country: Iran
- Province: Kerman
- County: Qaleh Ganj
- Bakhsh: Chah Dadkhoda
- Rural District: Rameshk

Population (2006)
  - Total: 138
- Time zone: UTC+3:30 (IRST)
  - Summer (DST): UTC+4:30 (IRDT)

Chahan (Persian: چاهان, also Romanized as Chāhān) is a village in Rameshk Rural District, Chah Dadkhoda District, Qaleh Ganj County, Kerman Province, Iran. At the 2006 census, its population was 138, in 41 families.
