= Master Shen-Long =

Chinese Artist & More

Chan Sheng-Yao
- 詹聖堯
- Known for: Buddhism, Daoism, Confucianism, Painting, Poetry, Calligraphy, Photography, Sculpture, Design, Art History and Culture

Master Shen-Long
- Traditional Chinese: 詹聖堯
- Simplified Chinese: 詹圣尧
Transcriptions
Standard Mandarin
- Hanyu Pinyin: Zhan Shèngyáo

Master Shen-Long, known as Chan Sheng-Yao (Chinese: 詹聖堯; pinyin: Zhān Shèngyáo), is a Taiwan-born contemporary Chinese artist, calligrapher, writer, poet, philosopher, Chan/Zen Buddhist master and founder of the Enlightenment Power Mind School. His courtesy name is Xiao Yao (逍遙), and amongst others his courtesy names are Shen Long (神龍), Tai Yi (the great purity) (太一), Tai Chu (the great beginning) who seeks enlightenment (太初道人), and so forth.

== Art ==
Master Shen-Long has exhibited his artwork in solo and group exhibitions throughout North America and Asia [see exhibitions]. As a multidisciplinary artist, he works in many styles and media including ink painting, watercolor, oil painting, sculpture, and photography. He is a contemporary master of Chinese painting, poetry and calligraphy. As observed by Chinese art historian Dr. Chu-tsing Li (李铸晋), Chan Sheng-yao's art is totally self-motivated, and he has attained his achievements without any teacher. He combines ink and other media together with techniques such as spraying and dripping to create abstract and semi-abstract paintings. His paintings can be viewed and displayed from both sides. He attempts to express the energy of the universe and the eternal state of ultimate harmony between humans and nature as advocated in Buddhism, Daoism and Confucian philosophies. His personal artistic theory and philosophy of “enlightenment power,” is grounded within these classical philosophical concepts of creation and human existence. He coined the term “enlightenment power” to describe the pure inherent nature of all beings to create their universe. He elaborates on this theory in “A Manifesto on the Use of Enlightenment Power and Enlightenment Ability in Art Creation” (覺能藝創).

== "Chan Sheng-Yao - An Artist Very Different From The Others" by Dr. Chu-Tsing Li ==
In Dr. Li Chu-Tsing Li's article “Chan Sheng-Yao – An Artist Very Different From The Others” (2000), he discusses the historical trajectory of Master Shen-Long's art. He notes that Master Shen-Long's art, from when he was a child until now, has been totally self-motivated, having attained his achievement without any teacher. Li writes that at present, Master Shen-Long's work has reached full maturity for he “has been able to synthesize his poetry, essays, calligraphy, painting, philosophical ideas, and Buddhist thought all into a unified expression attaining the level close to perfection”, and that Master Shen-Long has the facility to achieve whatever he wishes in his mind. Dr. Li notes that Master Shen-Long has absorbed the Chinese basic cultural elements of Confucianism, Buddhism, and Daoism, as well as Western influences, and modeled them together into a unified body of ideas; furthermore, that the great majority of his recent works have become milestones in the course of his artistic development. Dr. Li concludes the article by writing that Master Shen-Long's paintings have continuously presented new faces and new developments, which is the basic characteristic of a very creative artist and is also the best proof of Master Shen-Long's endless latent talent as a creative artist.

== Lectures ==
Master Shen-Long is a Chan/Zen Buddhist master. In 2013, he lectured on Buddhist philosophy at the School of the Art Institute of Chicago, and in 2014, he lectured on the topic of "Time, Space and Infinity" at the Loyola University Museum of Art.

He has conducted public talks on many Buddhist scriptures including the Platform Sutra of the Sixth Patriarch Huineng (六祖壇經), the Prajna Paramita Heart Sutra (心經), the Sutra of Infinite Life (佛說大乘無量壽莊嚴清淨平等覺經), the Buddha speaks of Amitabha Sutra (佛說阿彌陀經), the Essential Annotation on the Amitabha Sutra (彌陀經要解), the Great-Strength Bodhisattva (Great Strength; Mahasthamaprapta) Chants/Mindfulness Amitabha in Perfection to Become Buddha from the Surangama Sutra (大勢至菩薩念佛圓通章), the Surangama Sutra (楞嚴經) and the Vimalakirti Sutra (維摩詰經). His recent Buddhist publications include Wisdom of the Heart Sutra (2011), Amitabha (2013), Prajna, volumes I & II (2013), and the Platform Sutra of the Sixth Patriarch (2014).

== Selected exhibitions ==
- 2022 Group Exhibition, "Here After". Bridge Projects, Los Angeles (May 7 - July 30, 2022)
- 2021 Solo Exhibition, "Universe of the Mind". Hilliard Art Museum, University of Louisiana, Lafayette (July 20, 2021-January 22, 2022)
- 2019 Solo Exhibition, "Future Retrospective: Master Shen-Long". Crow Museum of Asian Art, Dallas, Texas (Jun 1, 2019-Aug 23, 2020)
- 2018 Exhibition and Performance, "Calligraphy: Shadow and Light". Co-commissioned by the Nancy A. Nasher and David J. Haemisegger Family SOLUNA International Music and Arts Festival and the Crow Collection of Asian Art. (May 22)
- 2018 Solo Exhibition, "To Infinity: The Art of Master Shen-Long". NorthPark Center, Dallas, Texas (Feb 15-Mar 21)
- 2017 Group Exhibition, "Landscape Relativities: The Collaborative Works of Arnold Chang and Michael Cherney". Crow Collection of Asian Art, Dallas, Texas (Feb 25 – June 25)
- 2004 Solo Exhibition, “we Awake Now”. Aion Art Gallery, Vancouver, British Columbia, Canada
- 2004 Solo Exhibition, “Bridge of Enlightenment: Chan Sheng-Yao – A Retrospective Exhibition in Spiritual Images”. Providence University Art Center, Taichung, Taiwan (Feb 9 – Mar 4)
- 2003 Solo Exhibition, “Abstraction in Ink”. Asian Center, University of British Columbia, Vancouver, British Columbia, Canada (Sept 23 – 30)
- 2003 Solo Exhibition, “Macrocosm, Microcosm, Introspection”. Dr. Sun Yet-Sen Memorial Museum, Taipei, Taiwan, (Apr 8 - 13)
- 2002 3rd International Ink Painting Biennial of Shenzhen, Shenzhen, People's Republic of China, (Dec 18, 2002 – Jan 8, 2003)
- 2002 Solo Exhibition, “Smashing and Recreating the Universe”. W Gallery, Vancouver, British Columbia, Canada (Oct 1-21, 2002)
- 1986 Group Exhibition, Asian-American Association Arts and Film Festival, University of Michigan, Ann Arbor, Michigan, USA (Nov)
- 1986 Solo Exhibition, “Women and Landscape”. Pingyang Art Gallery, Taipei, Taiwan

== Selected publications ==
- Platform Sutra of the Sixth Patriarch (Chinese Version) (2022)
- Platform Sutra of the Sixth Patriarch (2014) ISBN 978-0-9812378-7-9
- Prajna, I and II (2013) Volume 1 ISBN 978-0-9812378-4-8, Volume 2 ISBN 978-0-9812378-5-5
- Amitabha (2013) ISBN 9780981237862
- The Spirit of the Dragon: The Art of Master Sheng-Yao (2012) ISBN 9780981237831
- Up Close with Master Sheng-Yao (2012) DVD
- Wisdom of the Heart Sutra (2011) ISBN 9780981237824
- The Art of Chan Sheng-Yao (2010) ISBN 9780981237800
- Macrocosm, Microcosm, Introspection: Art of Chan Sheng-Yao (2003) ISBN 9572866605
- Smashing and Recreating the Universe: Chan Sheng-Yao's Art Generated by Enlightenment (2001) ISBN 9577447104
- Calligraphy written for the exhibition catalogue, Latter Days of the Law, Images of Chinese Buddhism 850-1850, edited by Marsha Weidner, Lawrence and Honolulu: Spencer Museum of Art, University of Kansas, University of Hawaii Press (1994) ISBN 9780824816612
