= In My Heart (film) =

2020 Malaysian musical romance film

- Directed by: Teddy Chin
- Starring: Charles Tu; Zen; Yuan Teng; Daniel Chezi; Uriah See; Huang Yi Fei
- Production company: More Entertainment
- Distributed by: MM2 Entertainment
- Release dates: 24 April 2020 (Taiwan); 24 September 2020 (Malaysia)
- Running time: 103 minutes
- Country: Malaysia
- Language: Mandarin

In My Heart (Chinese: 这一刻，想见你) is a 2020 Malaysian musical romance film. The film tells the story of a boy who gives up on his music dream after his brother went into coma after a tragedy. But soon he meets a girl, and rediscover their passion for music.

It is scheduled to be released on 24 April 2020 in Malaysia. The film features well-known Malaysian Chinese-language classic and pop songs.

== Synopsis ==
One night, music-loving brothers Ah Le and Ah Yuan break into the school auditorium to play an expensive piano. While they manage to distract the security guard, a serious accident occurs while they are trying to make their escape. Ah Yuan falls into a coma, leaving Ah Le feeling guilty to the point that he stops playing music. When Ah Le later enters university, he make friends with teammates who share the same passion for music. He also met an odd punk girl nicknamed Monster, whom he eventually falls for. Ah Le rediscovers his long-suppressed dreams, but when he decides to confess to Monster, something bad happens between them. How will their story goes?

== Cast ==
- Charles Tu as Chen Zi Le
- Zen as Monster
- Yuan Teng as Chen Zi Yuan
- Daniel Chezi as Niu Che Lun
- Uriah See as Lee Yong Lu
- Huang Yi Fei as Monster's Father
- Abbey Abimbola as Drug smuggler

== Production and release ==
The film features Taiwanese actor Charles Tu, Malaysian actor Yuan Teng, singers Zen, Daniel Chezi, Uriah See and veteran singer Huang Yi Fei. It features well-known Malaysian Chinese-language pop and classic songs.

The film was originally supposed to be released in Taiwan and Malaysia on 24 April 2020 simultaneously. However due to Malaysia's response to the COVID-19 situation, it was released only in Taiwan on that day. The film was subsequently released in Singapore on 13 August 2020 and in Malaysia on 24 September 2020.
