= Madhu Forest =

Or Madhuvana, a dense forest in ancient northern India

Madhu Forest or Madhuvana (Sanskrit: मधुवन) was a dense forest in ancient northern India, west of Yamuna.

== In the Ramayana and the Mahabharata ==
According to the Ramayana, an Asura named Madhu, ruled this forest and its territory. He was defeated by Shatrughna one of the brothers of king Raghava Rama of Kosala. Shatrughna later cleared this forest and built a city called Mathura here. This later became the capital of Surasena Kingdom as in the epic Mahabharata. Yadava kings Ugrasena and Kamsa ruled from geographic information

== In the Harivamsa ==
According to the Harivamsa (95.5242-8), a Yadava king Madhu, the descendant of Yadu ruled from Madhuvana. Rama's brother Shatrughna killed the Madhava Lavana, a descendant of Madhu, cut down the Madhuvana forest and built Mathura city there. After the death of Rama and his brothers, Bhima, son of Satvata, a descendant of Madhu recovered the city.
