= Kokilavan =

Near National highway 44

The Kokilavan Dham is the place where the famous Shani Dev Temple is situated in Kosi Kalan near Mathura in Uttar Pradesh, India.

This is a very ancient temple of Shani Dev and his guru Barkhandi baba. Devotees from all over India come here to do pooja here.
