= Mathura (disambiguation) =

Mathura may mean:

- Mathura, Uttar Pradesh, historic city in India
  - Mathura district, in which the city is located
  - Mathura (Lok Sabha constituency)
  - Mathura lion capital, Indo-Scythian sandstone capital from Mathura, dated to the 1st century CE
- Mathura (moth), a synonym of a genus of moths in the family Erebidae
- Madurai (also transliterated as Mathura), Tamil Nadu
- Mathra (also transliterated as Mathura), Kerala
- Mathra, North West Frontier, a corruption of "Mathura"
- Madura Island, Indonesia

== See also ==
- Mathurapur (disambiguation)
- Mathur (disambiguation)
- Madura (disambiguation)
- Madhuban (disambiguation)
- Madhu (disambiguation)
- Madhuri (disambiguation)
