= Madura (disambiguation) =

Madura is an island in Indonesia.

It may also refer to:

Indonesia

- Madura Strait, the narrow strait that separates Java island from Madura island.
- Madoera Residency, a Dutch East Indies administrative subdivision that included Madura Island.

Australia

- Madura, Western Australia, a small roadhouse community on the Roe Plains, along the Eyre Highway.
  - Madura Station, a pastoral lease and sheep station within the locality of Madura, Western Australia.

India

- An alternative name for Mathura, India
- An alternative name for Madurai, India

Others

- Madura (bug), a genus in the family Coreidae
- Madura (rock band)
- Lamborghini Madura - a concept car to be produced by the Italian sports car manufacturer Lamborghini

== See also ==
- Madurese (disambiguation)
- Madhu (disambiguation)
- Mathura (disambiguation)
- Madhuri (disambiguation)
- Bank of Madura
- Suzuki Madura
