= Jumbuck Pastoral Company =

Australian agriculture company

- Type: Private
- Founded: 1888
- Founder: HP MacLachlan
- Headquarters: Adelaide, South Australia
- Area served: Australia
- Owner: MacLachlan family
- Number of employees: 135
- Website: jumbuck.com.au

Jumbuck Pastoral Company is an Australian company that operates numerous cattle stations and sheep stations in New South Wales, the Northern Territory, South Australia and Western Australia.

It is one of the largest landowners in Australia and the biggest wool grower. As at 2013, Jumbuck controlled over 50,000 square kilometres (19,305 sq mi) of holdings which run approximately 320,000 head of sheep and 80,000 head of cattle.

The company is a privately held company owned by the MacLachlan family and is based in Adelaide.

== History ==
Jumbuck Pastoral Company was established in 1888 by H. P. MacLachlan who was known for his ability with stock and being able to ride out a drought. Initially the company was interested in wool growing in the arid at Paratoo Station near Yunta. It later diversified into cattle.

By the mid-1920s MacLachlan's son, B. H. MacLachlan, was running the company after his father had loaned him £16,000 to acquire and develop lands in the Tarcoola area. When MacLachlan Senior died in 1939, B. H. continued to expand the development plan with Commonwealth Hill Station and Mulgathing Station shearing over 100,000 sheep in 1945.

B.H. MacLachlan handed over to his son, Hugh MacLachlan in 1960 who took up pastoral leases in Western Australia at Rawlinna Station and Madura Plains.

The company was fined $100,000 in 2005 following the death of a jackaroo in New South Wales in 2001. Hugh MacLachlan stepped down as the managing director of the company in 2009 after nearly half a century in the role. His sons, Jock and Callum, were appointed as joint managing directors.

In 2014 the company acquired Killarney Station in the Northern Territory for $35 million. The property occupied an area of 2,819 square kilometres (1,088 sq mi) and supports a herd of approximately 26,000 cattle.

In February 2021, the company acquired the 1.25 million hectare Wave Hill Station in the Northern Territory for $100 million. In April 2023, Fortescue announced it was to acquire Rawlinna Station from Jumbuck Pastoral pending approval from the Government of Western Australia. In November 2024, Fortescue pulled out of the deal citing delays in the approval process.
