= Madhu (disambiguation) =

Madhu is a term in Hindi-Urdu, Sanskrit, and other Indian languages for honey.

Madhu may also refer to:

- Madhu, in Hindu mythology, one of the asura brothers Madhu-Kaitabha, killed by Vishnu
- Madhu Forest, or Madhuvana, a dense forest in ancient northern India, present-day Mathura
- Madhu (actor) (born 1933), Indian actor in Malayalam cinema
- K. Madhu, Indian film director who works in Malayalam cinema
- Madhu, Sri Lanka, a town in Sri Lanka where the Shrine of Our Lady of Madhu is located
  - Shrine of Our Lady of Madhu, a prominent Roman Catholic shrine in Sri Lanka
- Madhu (1959 film), an Indian Hindi-language film by Gyan Mukherjee
- Madhu (2006 film), an Indian Tamil-language film by Thennarasu
- Madhu (2014 film), 2014 Indian short film by Rathna Kumar

== See also ==
- Madhoo (born 1972), Indian actress
- Madhur, a Sanskrit word that means "honey-sweet"
- "O Madhu", a song by Devi Sri Prasad and Adnan Sami from the 2012 Indian film Julayi
- Madhuri (disambiguation)
- Mathura (disambiguation)
- Mathur (disambiguation)
- Madura (disambiguation)
- Madhuban (disambiguation)
- Madhubani (disambiguation)
- Madhusudan (disambiguation)
