= Mathurapur =

Mathurapur or Mothurapur can refer to:

== In India ==
- Shivnarayanpur, Bihar

In Diamond Harbour subdivision of South 24 Parganas district in the Indian state of West Bengal:

- Mathurapur, South 24 Parganas, a census town
- Mathurapur I (community development block),
- Mathurapur II (community development block)
- Mathurapur Assembly constituency, a former Legislative Assembly constituency in West Bengal
- Mathurapur (Lok Sabha constituency)

In Basirhat subdivision of North 24 Parganas district in the Indian state of West Bengal:

- Mathurapur, North 24 Parganas, a census town

In Malda district in the Indian state of West Bengal:

- Mathurapur, Malda, a village

== In Bangladesh ==
- A village in Madhukhali Upazila of Faridpur District, noted for Mathurapur Deul
- A union in Badalgachhi Upazila of Naogaon District
- A union in Daulatpur Upazila of Kushtia District
- A union in Dhunat Upazila of Bogra District

== See also ==
- Mathura (disambiguation)
