= Karavaloor =

Karavaloor Kerala Karavalur
- village
- Location in Kerala, India
- Coordinates: 8°59′0″N 76°55′30″E
- Founded by: Venad
- Named after: Venad

Government
  - Type: Panchayat
  - Body: Gram panchayat

Population (2011)
  - Total: 23,947

Languages
  - Official: Malayalam, English
- Time zone: UTC+5:30 (IST)
- PIN: 691333
- Telephone code: 0475
- Vehicle registration: KL-25
- Nearest city: Punalur
- Lok Sabha constituency: Kollam
- Vidhan Sabha constituency: Punalur

Karavaloor is a village in Kollam district in the Indian state of Kerala. It is known for the Peedika Bhagavathi Temple and its annual Meena Thiruvathira festival, held during the Malayalam month of Meenam. The festival includes traditional temple rituals, processions and cultural programmes, and attracts large numbers of devotees and visitors from Karavaloor and neighbouring areas. The celebrations are attended by people from different communities, reflecting the festival's wider cultural significance in the region.

== Peedika Bhagavathi Temple ==
Karavaloor Peedika Bhagavathi Temple is a Hindu temple located at Karavaloor in Kollam district, Kerala, India. The principal deity of the temple is Bhagavathi, worshipped as a form of Bhadrakali. The temple also has subsidiary shrines dedicated to Shiva and Ganesha.

According to local tradition, the name Karavaloor is associated with the goddess worshipped at the Peedika Bhagavathi Temple. The tradition connects the name with a karaval (sword) associated with the goddess. The same tradition is recorded in descriptions of the history of Karavaloor.

A traditional temple pond, locally known as the temple chira, is situated adjacent to the temple. The pond and the rituals and celebrations associated with it form part of the cultural traditions of the temple.

=== Festivals ===
The principal annual festival of the temple is the Meena Thiruvathira festival, held during the Malayalam month of Meenam (March–April). The festival traditionally lasts seven days and features temple rituals, percussion performances, processions and traditional performing arts.

The festival programme has included Kathakali, Thiruvathira, Bharath Kali, devotional and cultural programmes, as well as a ceremonial procession and Kuthiyottam. A 2024 report in Mathrubhumi documented the festival programme, including Kathakali, Pongala, Thiruvathira, Bharath Kali, procession and Kuthiyottam.

Other religious observances associated with the temple include Navaratri, Dhanu Thiruvathira, Mahashivaratri, Vishu, Vinayaka Chaturthi and Thrikarthika. The temple also conducts special rituals including Pongala and Kalamezhuthu-related observances.

== Geography ==
It sits approximately 65 km from the state capital, Thiruvananthapuram and approximately 5 km from Punalur on the Punalur-Thiruvananthapuram road.

Nearby villages include Poikayil, Ayanikode, Neelammal, Venchempu, and Mathra, where the Panchayath administrative office is located.

Native plants include natural rubber, banana, jackfruit, black pepper, guava, and Syzygium samarangense, with an abundance of Paddy fields and natural streams.

== History ==
Karavaloor can also be written as Karavalur. The name is derived from the legend of Shri Peedika Bhagavathy, the Goddess of Karavaloor, who appeared to the village with a Karaval ( കരവാള്‍, Sword in Dravidian Etymology) after she was called for their protection. The suffix Uru is Proto-Dravidian for "village".

It was once part of the Venad Kingdoms which laid the foundation for the later Chera kingdom. It developed trade links with Kollam Port and traded in spices and herbs as was common in the period.

== Karavaloor Market ==
Karavaloor has historically functioned as an important weekly market for the surrounding agricultural area. A study on agricultural and horticultural development in the region identified Karavaloor as one of the locations with weekly-market facilities and recorded three such market functions at Karavaloor. The study notes that weekly markets provided farmers with a means of selling agricultural produce, particularly during harvesting seasons.

The market continues to serve the local population and surrounding settlements as a centre for the sale of agricultural and other locally consumed goods.

== Demographics ==
Proto-Australoid tribes like the Kuravar, Pulayar and Paraiyar make up the native ancestral population. Minority groups include the Nair, the Vellala Pillai, Ezhava, Saint Thomas Christians, and the Muslim Mappila.

The population of the village is 23,947, 11,288 of them are males and 12,659 of them are females according to 2011 Indian Census.

The literacy rate of the village is higher compared to Kerala. In 2011, the village's literacy rate of was 95.37 % compared to Kerala's 94.00 %.

== Religion ==
Native Animism, Hinduism, Christianity, Islam and Tribal Religions are practiced.

Karavaloor features the Karavaloor Peedika Bhagavathy Goddess Temple, where Bhadrakali is the presiding deity. The annual festival of this temple is known for its processions.

Active temples include Padinjattinkara Shiva Temple, Paanayam Shiva Temple, Mathra Shiva Temple, and Murikolilkavu Parvathy Temple. They are worship sites, along with almost a dozen sacred groves that denote nature.

Churches are present, such as Karavaloor Bethel Marthoma Church (attracting more than 500 families), Kereeth Marthoma Church, St. Benedict Malankara Syrian Catholic Church, St. George Orthodox Church and Nithya Sahaya Matha Church.

Pentecostal churches include Assemblies of God churches, Church of God and many Independent Pentecostal churches.

== Economy ==
Key aspects of the local economy are rubber harvesting, banking, and remittances from migrant workers.

== Education ==
The village has two secondary schools, Karavaloor (AMMHS, established under the patronage of the Mar Thoma Syrian Church) which was first established by the Koipuram Family and Venchempu higher secondary school (NGPMHS). Neelammal is a government-run school for lower primary students. Private schools include the Oxford Central school and Carmel Central School.

== Politics ==
Karavaloor is part of the Punalur constituency and is home to many state ministers and leaders.

P.C Baby was the first panchayath president. The village is governed by a UDF majority committee. R.Lathikamma is the panchayath president.

== Transport ==
- Punalur KSRTC Bus Station (5 km)
- Kollam KSRTC Bus Station (Quilon) (40 km)
- Punalur Railway Station (6 km)
- Kollam Railway Station (38 km)
- Trivandrum International Airport (75 km)
