= Mathur =

== People ==
- Mathur (name), a clan of the Kayastha community in north India

== Places ==
- Mathur, a neighborhood in Chennai, Tamil Nadu, India
- Mathur, Krishnagiri, town in Tamil Nadu, India
- Mathur, Kumbakonam, village in Tamil Nadu, India
- Mathur, Thanjavur taluk, village in Tamil Nadu, India
- Mattur or Mathur, a village in Karnataka, India
- Mathur-I, a village in Palakkad district, Kerala, India
- Mathur-II, a village in Palakkad district, Kerala, India
- Mathur (gram panchayat), a gram panchayat in Palakkad district, Kerala, India
- Mathur Aqueduct, an aqueduct in Kanyakumari district, Tamil Nadu, India

== See also ==
- Mathura (disambiguation)
