= Madhuban (disambiguation) =

Madhuban is a neighbourhood in Jorhat city, Assam, India.

Madhuban may also refer to:

- Madhuvan, a forest in ancient India, near present-day Mathura
- Madhuban, Giridih, a village in Pirtand block, Giridih district, Jharkhand, India
- Madhuban, Dhanbad, a census town in Baghmara (community development block), Dhanbad district, India
- Madhuban, Bihar Assembly constituency
- Madhuban, Uttar Pradesh Assembly constituency

== See also ==
- Madhubani (disambiguation)
- Madhu (disambiguation)
- Mathura (disambiguation)
