= Madhusudan =

Madhusudan may refer to:

- Madhusudana, an epithet of the Hindu deity Vishnu
- Madhusudan (film), a 1941 Bollywood film

== People ==
- Madhusudan Gupta (1800–1856), Indian doctor
- Michael Madhusudan Dutt (1824–1873), 19th-century Indian poet and dramatist from Bengal
- Madhusudan Das (1848–1934), Orissan poet and freedom fighter
- Madhusudan Dhaky (1927–2016), Indian architectural and art historian from Gujarat
- Madhusudan Rao (1853–1912), Oriya poet known as "Bhaktakabi"
- V. Madhusudhana Rao (1923–2012), Telugu cinema director and script writer
- Madhusudan Mistry (born 1945), Indian politician from Gujarat
- Madhu Sudan (born 1966), Indian computer scientist
- M. D. Madhusudan, Indian wildlife biologist and ecologist
- Solipuram Madhusudhan Reddy (born 1940), Indian botanist
- Madhusudhan Rao (actor), actor

== See also ==
- Madhu (disambiguation)
