= P. R. G. Mathur =

Indian anthropologist (1934–2022)

P. R. G. Mathur (12 October 1934 – 16 November 2022) was an Indian anthropologist noted for his studies on the indigenous communities in India in general and Kerala in particular. He is also known for his efforts to bring the tribal community in Attappadi and Wayanad in Kerala to the mainstream of society by working among them. He had held several positions in the Anthropological Survey of India. He served the Kerala Institute for Research, Training and Development Studies of Scheduled Castes and Scheduled Tribes (KIRTADS) as its director for more than 15 years.

== Life and career ==
P. R. G. Mathur was born on 12 October 1934 in Mathur village in Palakkad district in Kerala. He joined the Anthropological Survey of India in 1959 and worked there in various capacities till 1973. While he was working in Anthropological Survey of India, he also found time to work for a PhD degree in Calcutta University under the supervision of Prof. Surajit Chandra Sinha, a well-known anthropologist and a former vice-chancellor, Visva-Bharati University, Santiniketan. The university awarded him the PhD degree in 1973. During the period 1973 to 1979, Mathur worked as a special officer for Tribal Research and Training Centre, Kozhikode established by Government of Kerala. The Tribal Research and Training Centre was reorganised as Kerala Institute for Research, Training and Development Studies (KIRTADS) in 1979, and Mathur was appointed the director of the institute, and he continued in that position until 1987. During the period 1973-87, Mathur was also academically associated with Calicut University teaching anthropology and guiding students for doing research in anthropology. He had also served Govt. of Kerala during 1987-89 as a special officer in the SC & ST Development Department.

In 1979, he helped found the Ananthakrishna Iyer International Centre for Anthropological Studies (AICAS) in Palakkad and served as an executive committee member until 1992. From 1993 to 2002 he was associated with AICAS as its secretary and during 2003-07 served as its director. During 2003-07 he was also the vice-chairman of the Centre for Indigenous Knowledge, Science and Culture (CIKSC), Kozhikode.

== Recognition ==
The many accolades conferred on P. R. G. Mathur include:

- Awarded Fulbright Fellowship in Anthropology in 1982
- Visiting Fellow, International School of Dravidian Linguistic Studies, Thiruvananthapuram in 1992
- Consultant Anthropologist for the National Commission for Backward Classes during 1996-98
- Awarded the first Ananathakrishna Iyer Memorial Award by the Anthropological Association, Mysore in 2007

== Books authored by Mathur ==
1. "Sacred Complex of the Sabarimala Ayyappa Temple", B. R. Publishing Corporation (2019)
2. "Sacred Complex of the Guruvayur Temple", Aryan Books International (2009), ISBN 8173053677
3. "Ecology, Technology and Economy: Continuity and Change Among the Fisherfolk of Kerala", Rawat Publications, Illustrated edition (2008), ISBN 8131601978
4. "Applied Anthropology and Challenges of Development in India", Pustak Mahal (2004), ISBN 8185094799
5. "The Khasi of Meghalaya : study in tribalism and religion", Cosmo Publications, New Delhi (1979)
6. "The Mappila Fisherfolk of Kerala: A Study in Inter-relationship Between Habitat, Technology, Economy, Society, and Culture", Kerala Historical Society (1977)
7. "Tribal situation in Kerala", Kerala Historical Society, Thiruvananthapuram (1977)
