= Vishram Ghat =

Ghat in Mathura

Religion
- Affiliation: Hinduism

Location
- Country: India
- Interactive map of Vishram Ghat
- Coordinates: 27°30′45.541″N 77°41′13.247″E

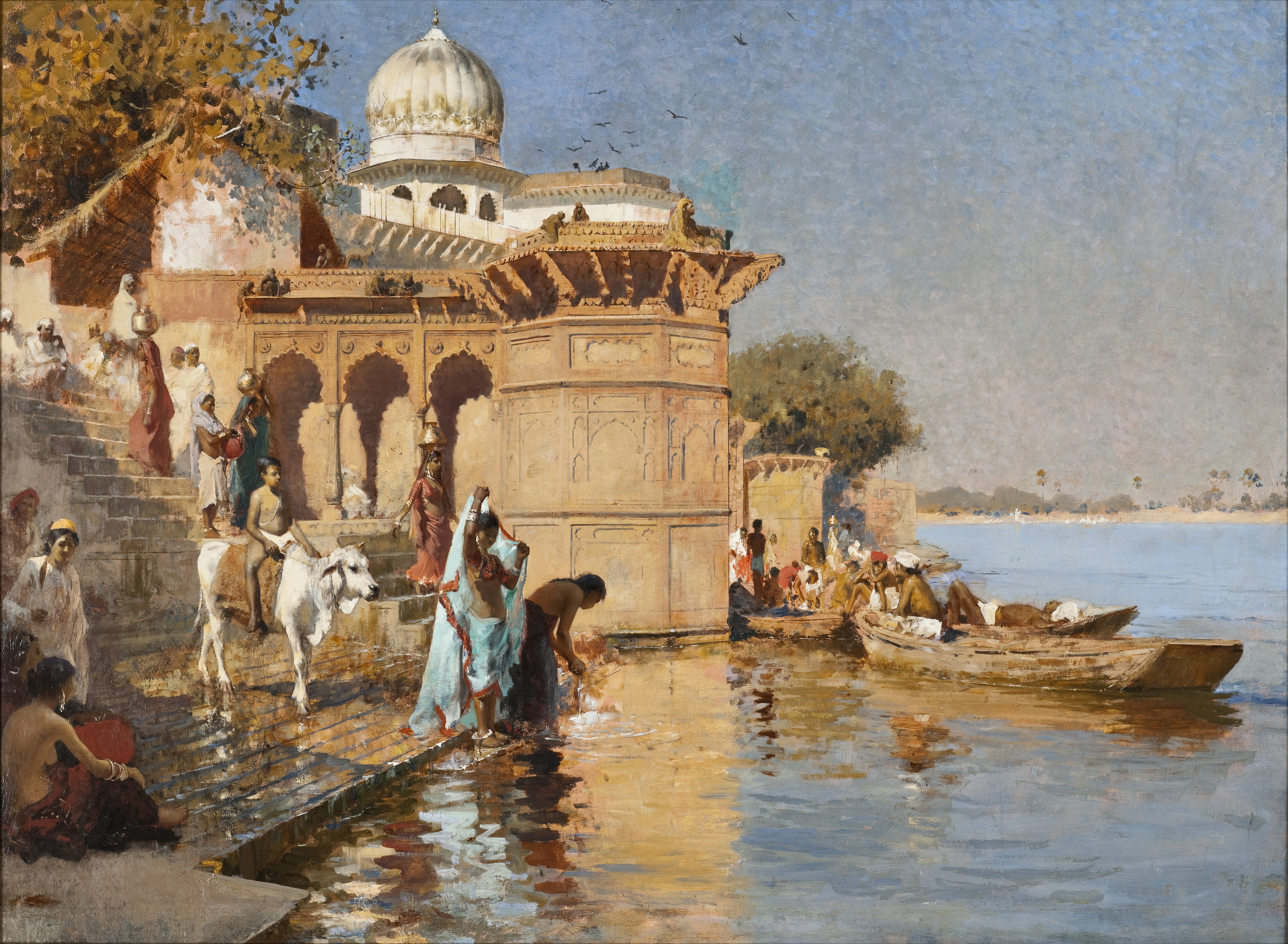
Along the Ghats of Mathura by Edwin Lord Weeks, c. 1883

Vishram Ghat is a ghat, a bath and worship place, on the banks of river Yamuna in Mathura, India. The traditional parikrama starts and ends at Vishram Ghat. Krishna, a major deity in Hinduism, is said to have rested here after killing Kamsa and the ghat's name, Vishram Ghat, means "ghat of rest." However, according to the Varāha Purāṇa, it was Vasudeva who rested at the site and is whom the ghat is named after. None of the Vaishnavite deities present at the ghat mentioned by Rupa Goswami in the 16th century survive to modern day. According to tradition, the site was formerly a cremation ground. The ghat's structures were built over the centuries by noble and royal patrons.
