= Madhuri =

Madhuri may refer to:

== People ==
=== Mononym ===
- Madhuri (singer)
- Madhuri (Tamil actress), Indian actress

=== Given name ===
- Madhuri Bhattacharya (born 1982), Indian actress and model
- Madhuri Dixit (born 1967), Indian actress
- Madhuri Mehta (born 1991), Indian cricketer
- Madhuri Misal, leader of Bharatiya Janata Party

=== Surname ===
- Geetha Madhuri (born 1985), Indian artist, composer and singer
- P. Madhuri (born 1943), South Indian playback singer

== Other uses ==
- Madhuri (1989 film), a Kannada film directed by K. V. Jayaram
- Madhuri (2018 film), a Marathi film
- Madhuri, a 2005 album by Zubeen Garg

== See also ==
- Madhu (disambiguation)
- Madura (disambiguation)
- Mathura (disambiguation)
