= Madurese =

Madurese may refer to:

- Of, from, or pertaining to the Indonesian island of Madura
- Madurese people, an ethnic group of Indonesia from the island of Madura
- Madurese language, their Austronesian language
- Madurese cuisine

== See also ==
- Madura (disambiguation)
