= Madura Station =

Pastoral lease in Western Australia

Coordinates: 31°53′01″S 127°01′25″E

Location in Western Australia

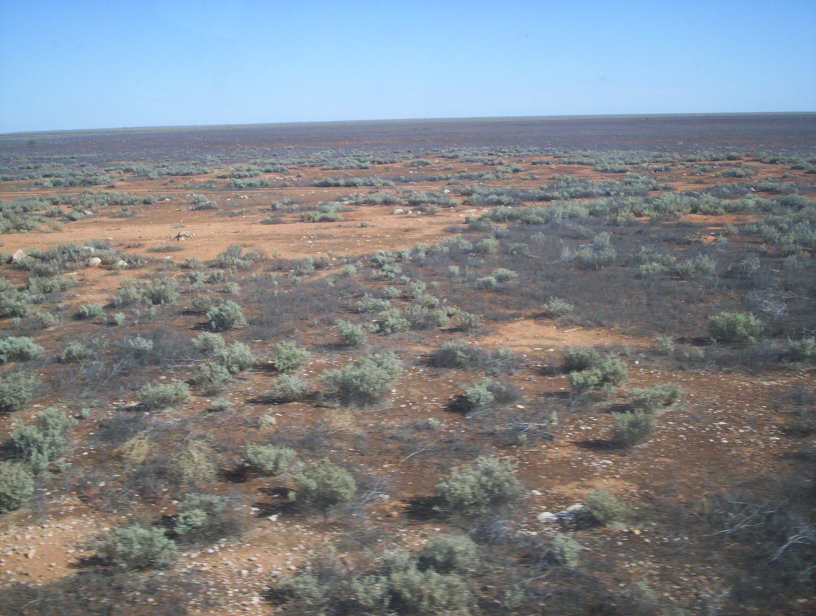
The Nullarbor Plain

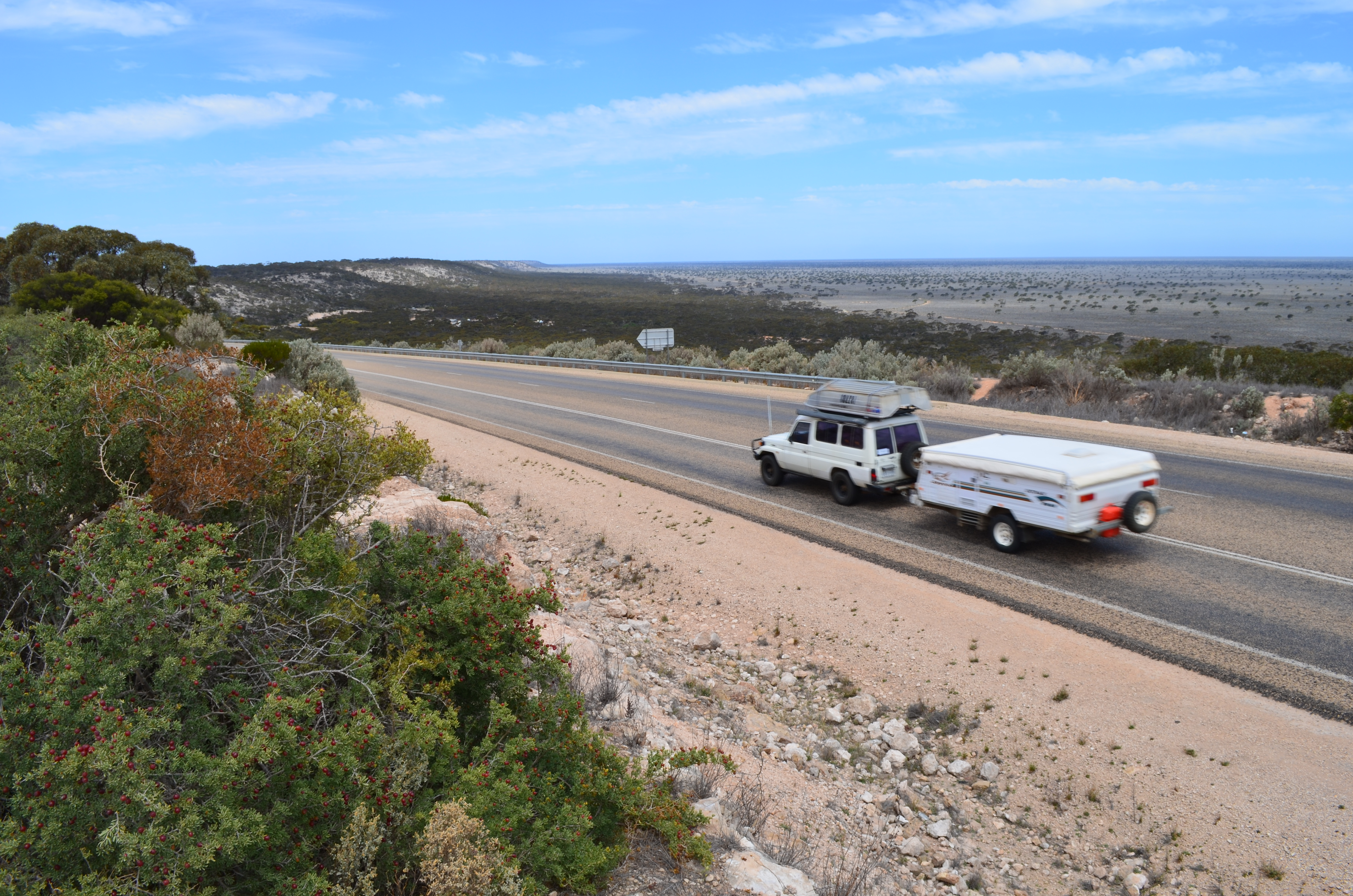
View of the Madura Pass towards the roadhouse, 2012

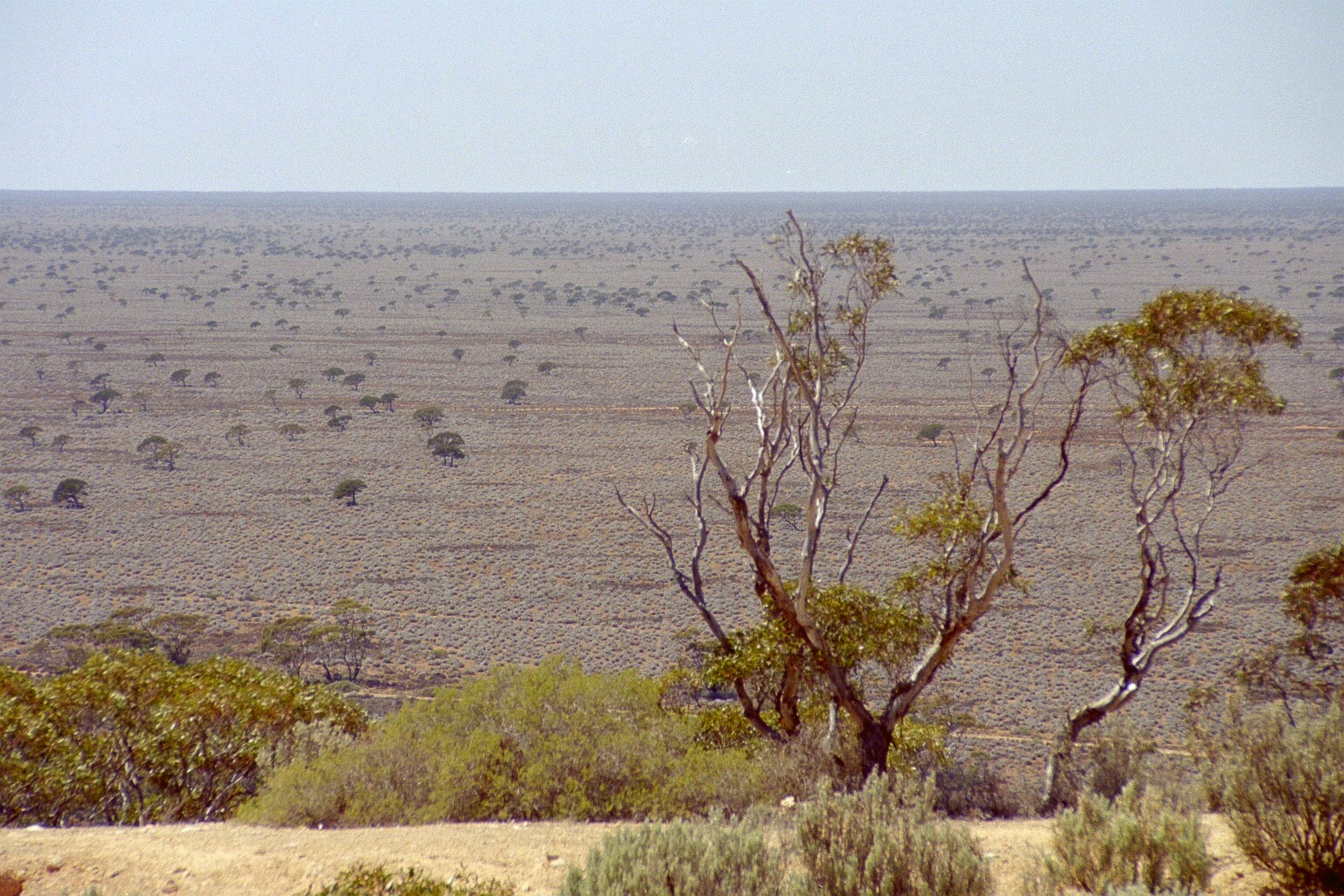
View of the Nullarbor from Madura Pass

Madura Station, also known as Madura Plains, is a pastoral lease and sheep station located about 700 kilometres (435 mi) east south east of Kalgoorlie in the Goldfields-Esperance region of Western Australia. It is within the locality of Madura and the Eyre Highway runs along the boundary of the station.

== Description ==
The station occupies an area of approximately 7,082 square kilometres (2,734 sq mi; 1,750,000 acres) – making it larger than the nation of Brunei – in the remote south east of Western Australia. It is the second largest sheep station in Australia, after Rawlinna, and is owned by CC Cooper & Co.

In 1927, the extent of the Madura Station was reported as 810,000 hectares (2 million acres).

The station has a carrying capacity of 58,000 sheep, which are Merinos raised for their wool. The company employed eight staff in 2012 working under the supervision of the station manager, Matt Haines.

The land is mostly gently undulating calcareous plains with eucalypt–melaleuca–myall woodlands and chenopod shrubland interspersed with saltbush shrubland and bindii grassland. Many caves can be found amongst the limestone bedrock of the Nullarbor Plain.

== History ==
The traditional owners of the area are the Mirning people, whose territory stretched across the Nullarbor and into South Australia.

Europeans settled the area in 1876 to breed horses, which were sent to India to be used by the British Army. The first recorded lease encompassing the old homestead was by G. Heinzmann for a period of one year; the lease was not renewed for 1878.

The station underwent significant improvements through 1884, including the addition of fencing and water tanks. Bores were sunk and brackish water was found and then drilled through in the hope of finding permanent freshwater.

In 1888 the Madura Squatting and Investment Company was floated to raise £100,000, equivalent to A$1.6 million in 2022, capital to take over the leasehold and many surrounding blocks, to have a total usable area of over 16,187 square kilometres (6,250 sq mi), which equates to 1.62 million hectares (4.00 million acres). The property included a good homestead and a well provisioned store, and had been recently depastured and was only carrying 800 merino ewes and a few horses.

The Ponton brothers and John Sharp were the next to take up the lease, in 1898, when the property was known as Clifton Downs Station.

A rabbit plague swept through the area and continued westward in 1901. William Ponton reported that millions of rabbits were already between Eucla and Nullarbor.

Shortly afterwards A. J. Talbot took over the property, along with Mundrabilla Station. Talbot was also raising mostly cattle along with horses as well as a small herd of camels at Madura. The artesian bores were pumping 170,000 litres (44,000 US gal) per day from a depth of 671 metres (2,200 ft) to water stock. Cattle from Madura were routinely being overlanded to the Kalgoorlie saleyards.

In 1927 the Madura Pastoral and Settlement Company successfully acquired 20,233 square kilometres (7,812 sq mi), which equates to 2 million hectares (5 million acres), around Madura Station with the intention of developing it for settlement. The company wanted the federal government to spend £A 100,000 on dog-proof fencing and water boring to make over 6 million hectares (15 million acres) of land able to carry an additional one million sheep that would be able to produce an additional 30,000 bales of wool. The station changed hands at some point around the same time and was owned by Charles Bowen from 1927 to 1932 when he became ill and was no longer able to operate the rationing depot for the department of Aboriginal Protection.

Several hundred brumbies were roaming Madura station in 1933 along with a substantial herd of wild cattle. The station owners erected trap and stockyards at an artesian bore that had been flowing continuously for 28 years. Other men from the district had come and had caught over 300 of the horses, which were taken and sold. The bore was also a stopping place for overlanders with the warm water making it a popular bathing place.

The area experienced heavy rains in 1934 resulting in boggy roads under 610 millimetres (2 ft) of water.

The station manager, W. O'Donovan had to be evacuated by an emergency flight by Goldfields Airways using a new Fox Moth airplane when he was dangerously ill in 1935. A doctor was on board and O'Donovan was flown to Kalgoorlie for treatment. O'Donovan died the following day as a result of an internal haemorrhage.

The acting manager and former stockman, Michael O'Brien, was charged with cattle stealing in 1937. O'Brien had taken 102 cattle to Loongana and put another brand on them before selling them. He defended himself saying that the Melbourne-based company had not paid him any wages since the death of O'Donovan.

In 1939 flooding occurred in areas around the station and Madura recorded 25 millimetres (1 in) of rain, filling dams and weirs. Strong winds blew down many trees causing problems on roads in the area.

The station had been the target of thieves and vandals in 1940 prompting the station owner's wife to carry a revolver whenever her husband was away. Sign-posts and water tanks had been damaged, articles had been stolen and even the homestead had been burnt down by a party of overlanders. The manager at the time, Robert Mackie, was often away overlanding himself and often reported on the road conditions in the area, particularly the Madura Pass.

1941 saw heavy rains in the area with 76 millimetres (3 in) of rain being recorded at the homestead. Mackie reported 274 metres (300 yd) of the pass being washed away, making it impossible for even camels to traverse.

Four young men were arrested at Madura in 1947 after they stole a car in Norseman, some 563 kilometres (350 mi) to the west of Madura, and made for the South Australian border before their car broke down near the homestead. They fled into the bush but were found by Aboriginal trackers and apprehended by police.

The station was gripped by drought in 1948 with 400 cattle dying as a result of lack of feed. The remaining herd of about 500 was to be driven to Loongana to look for feed and water.

Rumours were rife in the press that the station had been abandoned in 1949, after several travellers found dead crows and rabbits around the homestead. Mackie denied the claims, saying he was in Kalgoorlie for an extended business trip. Later the same year the Reverend Sopher, his wife and five children arrived at Madura to set up a home and school for Aboriginal children under the auspices of the Australian Aborigines Evangelical Mission. A few months later Mrs Sopher was badly burnt when a spark from the oven set her dress alight; she then had to endure the long trip to Norseman hospital for treatment. In 1950 the mission was issued a writ claiming damages for breach of contract on behalf of Madura Ltd concerning the sale of the station to the mission. Later the same year Mackie began to convert the homestead into a stopping place following six years of drought. Although some heavy rains had fallen they were too far apart to be of any use and the station had virtually no stock left on it. Petrol pumps were installed and the homestead was converted to a motel-hotel, with a liquor licence granted later the same year.

Mackie was taken to hospital in 1951 with heart troubles and the station was sold later the same year to a group of developers who were to turn the area into a tourist resort.

In the 1960s the Birmingham family (of the defunct Charlie Carter's grocery chain) held the lease, and the station manager was Brian O'Connor – brother of the politician Ray O'Connor.

The Jumbuck Pastoral Company acquired Madura in 1987, adding it to the neighbouring Moonera and began sub-dividing large paddocks and installing extra windmills and water points. Matt Haines was appointed manager in 2011; in the same year 30,000 sheep were shorn producing 850 bales of wool. This followed a good season where the property received 432 millimetres (17 in) of rain, nearly double the annual average.

In 2012 a fire burned for three days near Madura, covering the Eyre Highway in smoke. Over 300 hectares (741 acres) of bushland was consumed by the blaze.

Madura Plains Station was purchased by CC Cooper & Co, Jamestown, South Australia from Jumbuck Pastoral in February 2016 for A$10 million.

== See also ==
- List of ranches and stations
- List of the largest stations in Australia
