= Mathur Gram Panchayat =

Gram Panchayat in Kerala, India

Mathur is a gram panchayat in the Palakkad district, state of Kerala, India. It is a local government organisation that serves the villages of Mathur-I and Mathur-II.

== See also ==
P. R. G. Mathur
