= Rawlinna Station =

Pastoral lease in Western Australia

Coordinates: 31.00955°S 125.33075°E

Location in Western Australia

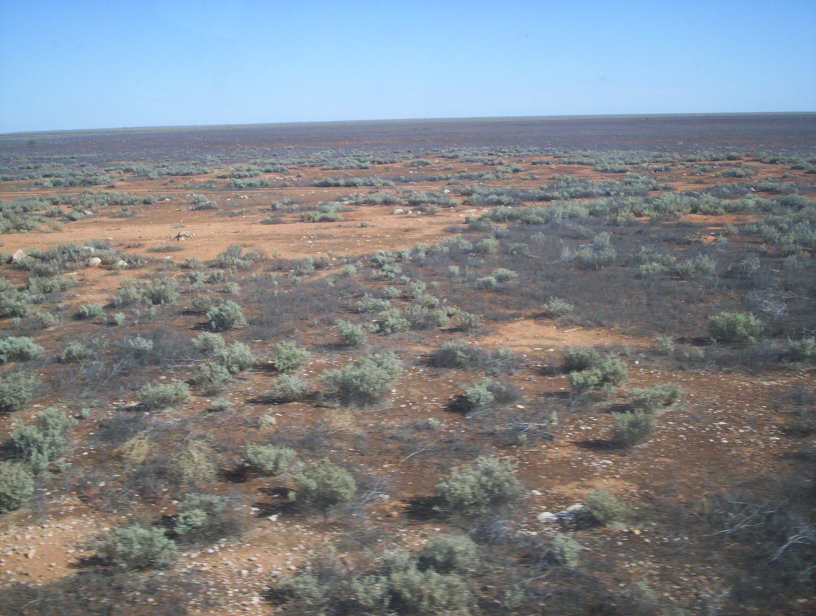
The Nullarbor Plain

Rawlinna Station is a pastoral lease and sheep station located about 339 kilometres (211 mi) east of Kambalda in the Goldfields-Esperance region of Western Australia. The locality of Rawlinna and the Trans-Australian Railway are situated along the boundary of the station. It is the second largest in Australia.

== Description ==
The station occupies an area of about 10,117 square kilometres (3,906 sq mi) or 2.5 million acres in the remote south east of Western Australia, making it the largest sheep station in Australia. It is owned by the Jumbuck Pastoral Company. The station is an amalgamation of the Pondana, Rawlinna and Vanesk leases. It encompasses part of the Nullarbor Plain, so the geology changes from the red dirt of the goldfields to the plain's famous white limestone outcrops. The vegetation changes from woodlands to the east to drought-resistant shrubs and grasses on the plain.

Feral dogs are a problem for graziers on the Nullarbor, so a 3-metre (10 ft) dog-proof fence was constructed with marsupial netting at the base; it is 370 kilometres (230 mi) in length. A separate 900-square-kilometre (347 sq mi) block adjoins the fence that is also dog proofed with a solar powered electric fence. Stock are watered from 37 bores in 87 main paddocks, along with other holding paddocks. Some of the bores are 140 metres (459 ft) deep and are all powered by windmills.

A homestead exists about 11 kilometres (7 mi) south west of the railway siding. A huge shearing complex, known as the Depot Outstation, was built in the middle of the property in 1967. The outstation has a 16-stand shearing shed, an overseer's house, shearers' and station hands' accommodation, mess and kitchen facilities.

The property is stocked with approximately 60,000 sheep, with wool being sent to Adelaide for testing and sale. The record number of sheep shorn at Rawlinna is 80,000.

== History ==
The traditional owners of the land are the Mirning, Ngalea and Wangai peoples, who have inhabited the area for over 10,000 years.

John Eyre and his companion Wylie passed through the area as they crossed the Nullarbor in the expedition of 1841. Eyre commented that the Nullarbor was "a blot on the face of nature".

Established in 1962 by Hugh MacLachlan, of the South Australian pastoral family, the station has a short history compared to other properties of its type around Australia.

Through the late 20th century the area proved to be prime pastoral and breeding country when seasonal conditions were good. In those days the station held between 40,000 and 60,000 sheep, and annually produced 1100 to 1700 bales of wool.

In 2001, an amount of 78,417 sheep were shorn for 2,177 bales of wool.In 2014 around 53,000 sheep were shorn and 1,285 bales of wool were produced.

The station had a poor season in 2005, with only 4 inches (102 mm) of rain falling compared to the average of 9 inches (229 mm). By 2006 things had improved, with 6 inches (152 mm) falling before the onset of winter, guaranteeing that winter grasses would germinate and stock of 32,000 sheep on the property at that stage would have adequate feed.

Ross Wood, the station manager, retired in 2007. Wood was the third manager employed at Rawlinna since 1967, the other two being David Seaton and Murray McQuie. Michael Simons, who started with Jumbuck as a jackaroo in 1983, replaced Wood in 2007. Jimmy Wood became station manager in 2018.

In April 2023, Fortescue announced it planned to acquire the station for renewable energy generation. After Fortescue withdrew from the sale citing delays in the ministerial approval process, the station was put up for sale. In March 2025, UK-based Consolidated Pastoral Company (CPC) entered an agreement to purchase the station. It planned to increase the size of the sheep flock and possibly stock the station with cattle.
