= Madhubani =

Madhubani may refer to:

- Madhubani district in Bihar, India
  - Madhubani, India, the city serving as district headquarters
  - Madhubani (Lok Sabha constituency)
  - Madhubani (Vidhan Sabha constituency)
  - Madhubani art
- Madhubani, Nepal

== See also ==
- Madhuban (disambiguation)
