= Mathura =

City in Uttar Pradesh, India

- City
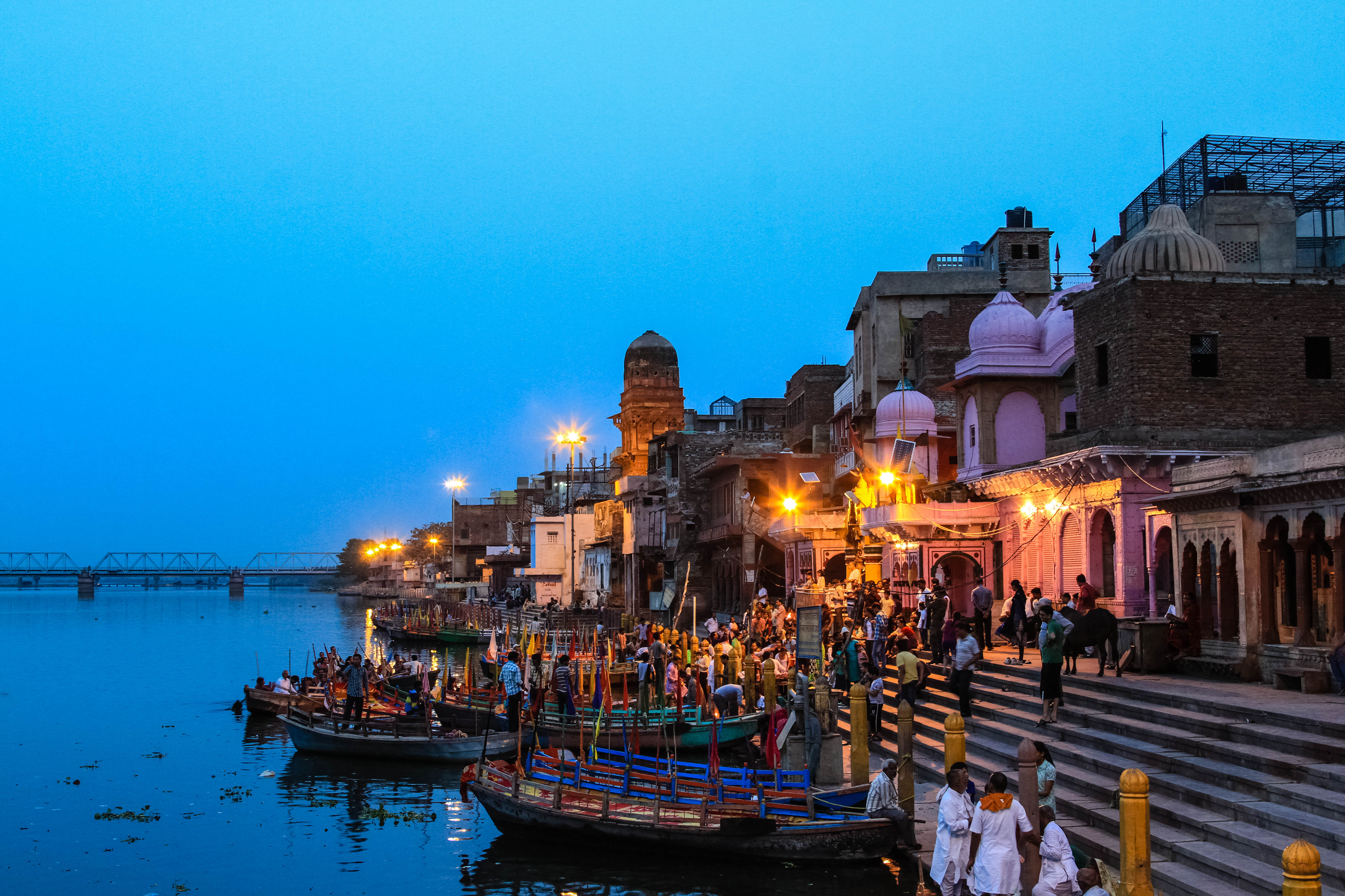
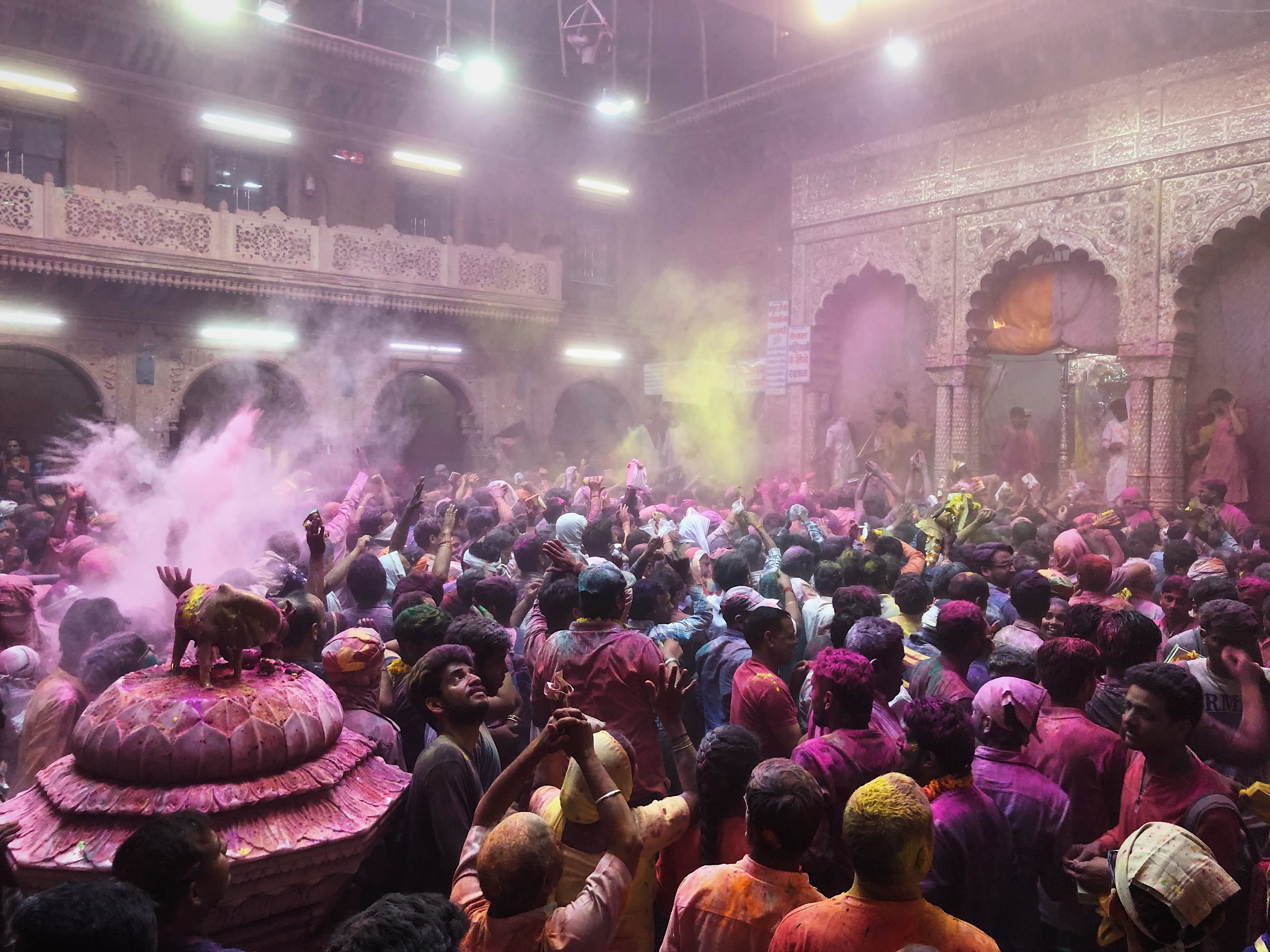
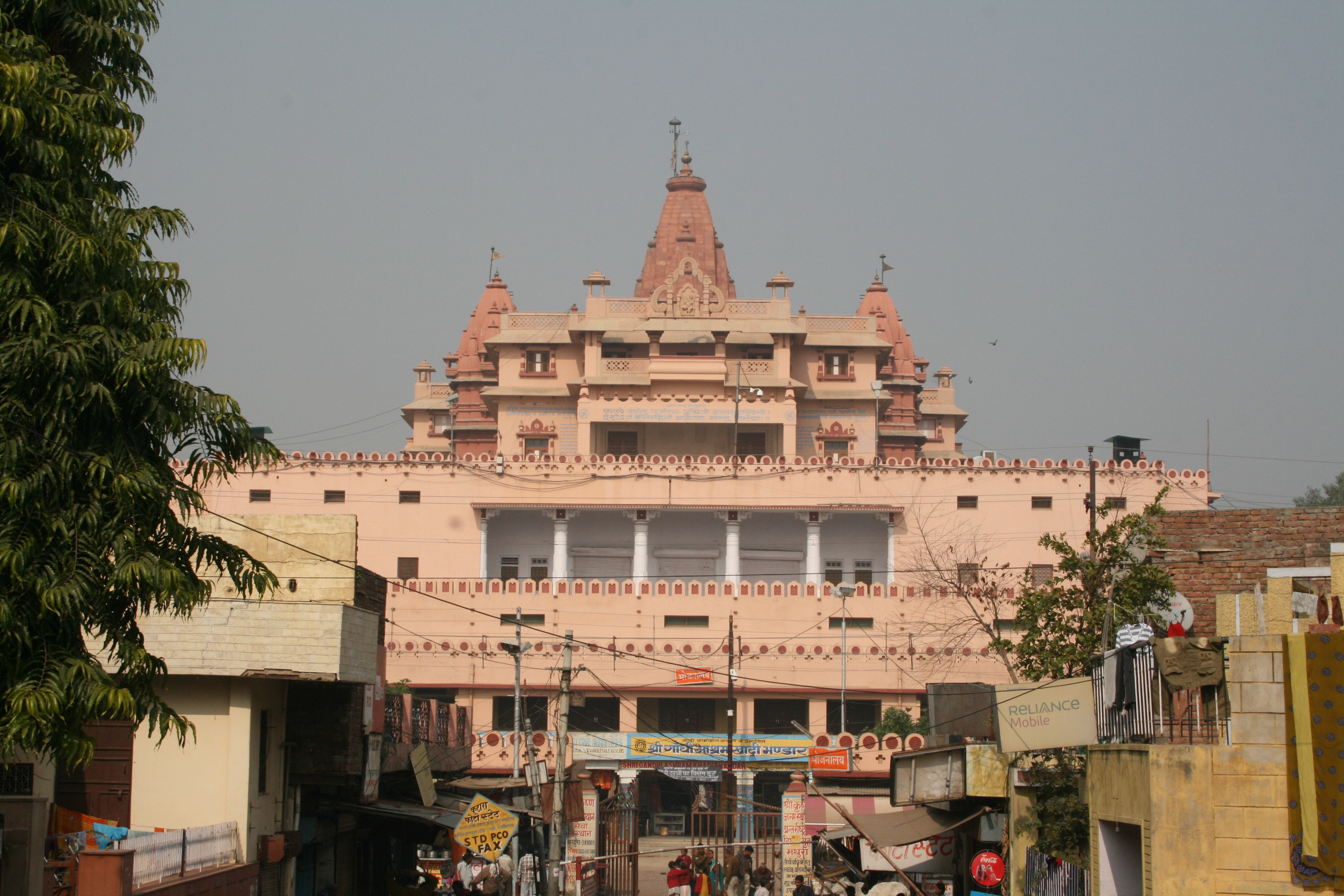
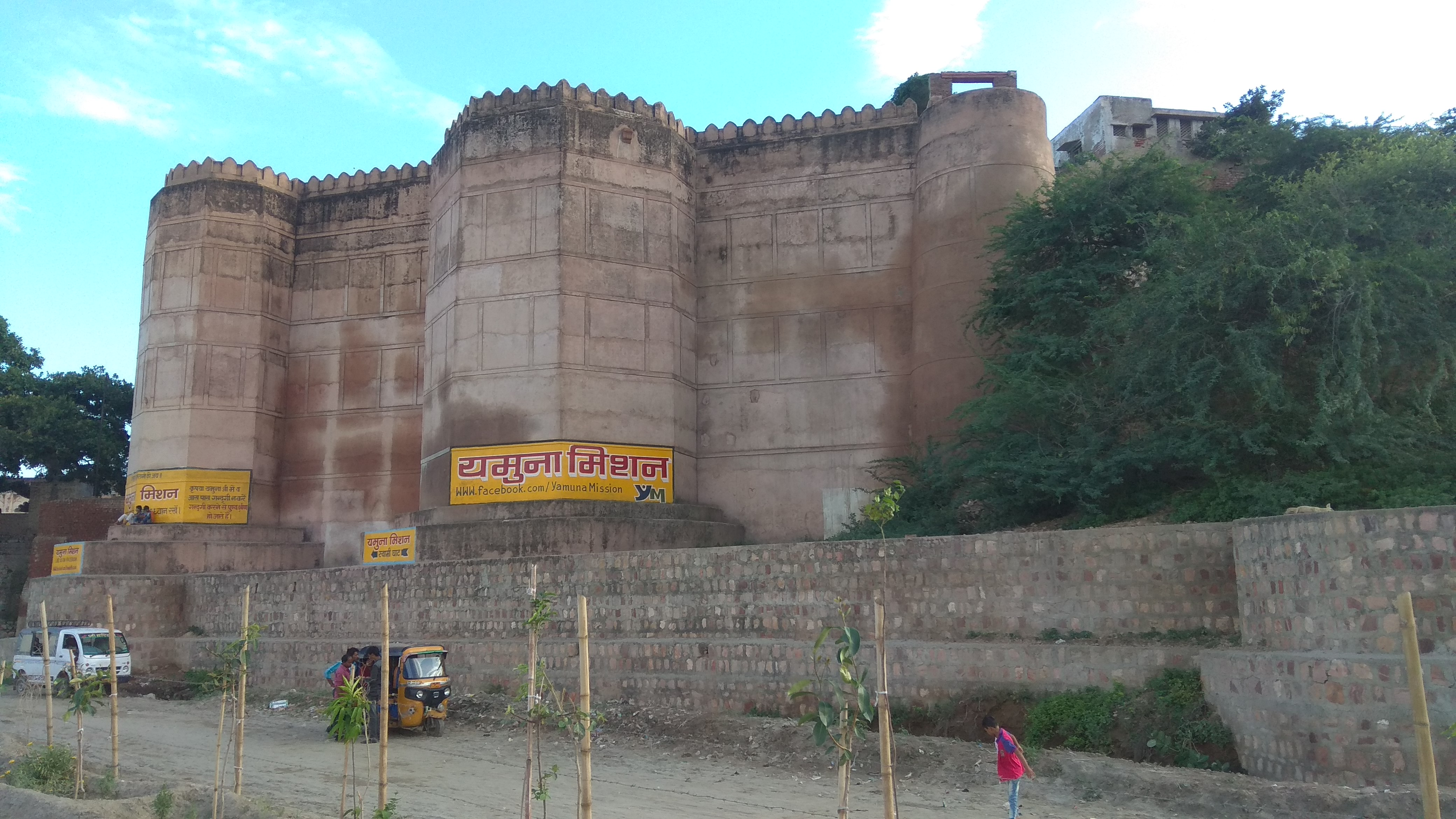
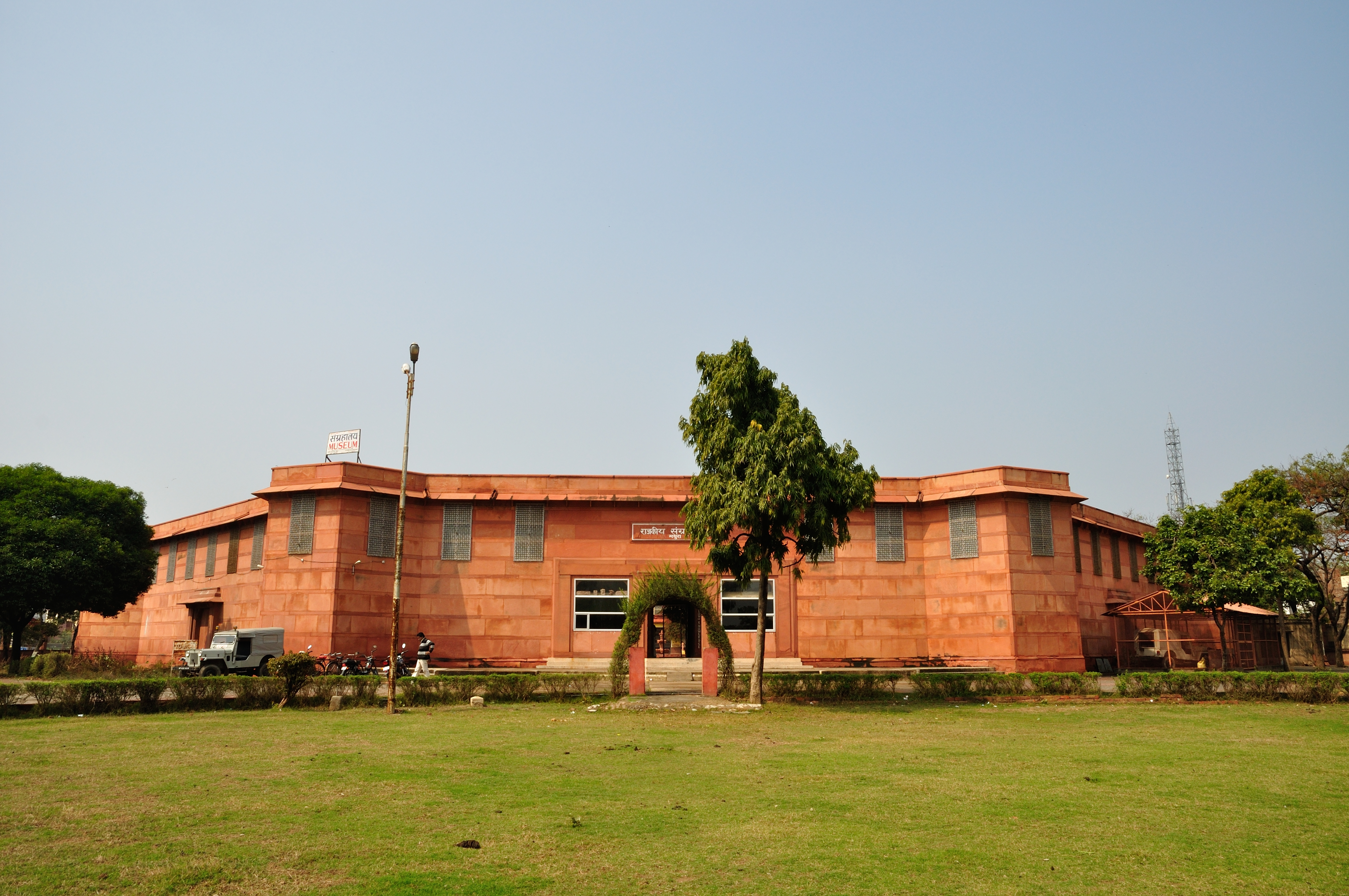
- Clockwise from top: Vishram Ghat on banks of river Yamuna, Krishna Janmasthan Temple Complex, Mathura Museum, Kans Quila and Holi celebrations in Mathura
- Nicknames: Krishnanagri; The City of Lord Krishna
- Location within Uttar Pradesh Location within India
- Coordinates: 27°29′33″N 77°40′25″E
- Country: India
- State: Uttar Pradesh
- District: Mathura
- Division: Agra
- Settled: 1100 BCE

Government
  - Type: Municipal Corporation
  - Body: Mathura-Vrindavan Municipal Corporation
  - Mayor: Vinod Agarwal (BJP)
  - Member of Legislative Assembly: Shrikant Sharma (BJP)
  - Member of Parliament: Hema Malini (BJP)

Area
  - Total: 39 km^{2} (15 sq mi)

Population (2011)
  - Total: 441,894
  - Density: 11,000/km^{2} (29,000/sq mi)

Language
  - Official: Hindi
  - Additional official: Urdu
  - Regional: Braj Bhasha
- Time zone: UTC+5:30 (IST)
- PIN: 281001
- Telephone code: 0565
- Vehicle registration: UP-85
- Website: mathura.nic.in

Mathura (Braj pronunciation: [mɐ.t̪ʰʊ.ɾäː]) is a city and the administrative headquarters of Mathura district in the Indian state of Uttar Pradesh. It is located 162 kilometres (101 mi) south-east of Delhi; and about 15 kilometres (9.3 mi) from the town of Vrindavan. In ancient times, Mathura was an economic hub, located at the junction of important caravan routes. The 2011 Census of India estimated the population of Mathura at 441,894.

In Hinduism, the birthplace of Krishna, one of the main deities, is believed to be located in Mathura at the Krishna Janmasthan Temple Complex. It is one of the Sapta Puri, the seven cities considered holy by Hindus, also called the Mokshyadayni Tirth. The Kesava Deo Temple was built in ancient times on the site of Krishna's birthplace (an underground prison). Mathura was the capital of the kingdom of Surasena, ruled by Kamsa, the maternal uncle of Krishna. Mathura is part of the Krishna circuit (Mathura, Vrindavan, Barsana, Govardhan, Kurukshetra, Dwarka and Bhalka). Krishna Janmashtami is celebrated in Mathura every year.

Mathura has been chosen as one of the heritage cities for the Heritage City Development and Augmentation Yojana scheme of Government of India.

== History ==
Traditionally it is believed that it was founded by Shatrughna after killing Yadava Lavana at the site of Madhuvana. According to Ramayana it was founded by Madhu (a man of the Yadu tribe). Later on Madhu's son Lavanasura was defeated by Shatrughna.

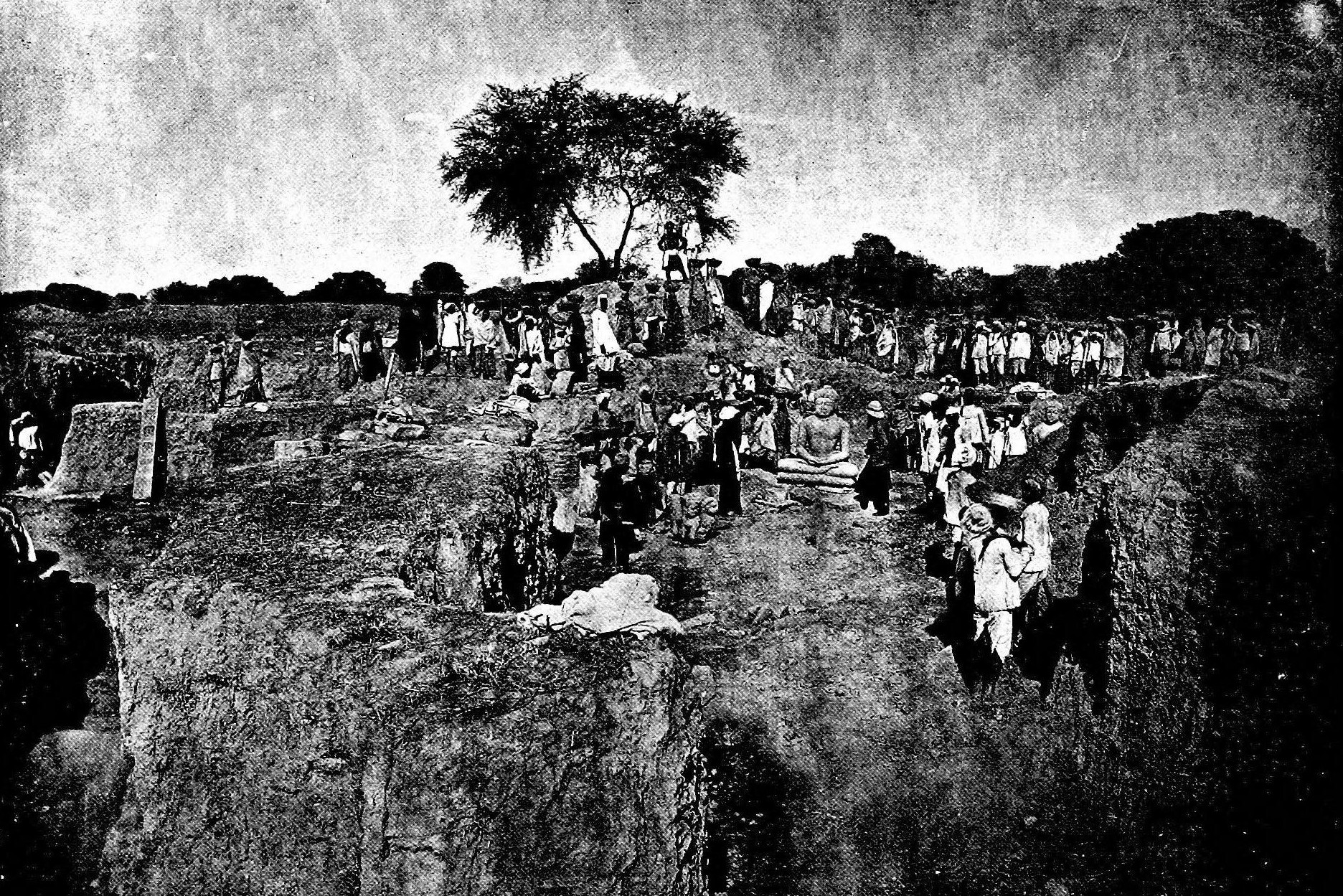
General view of the excavations in January 1889 at Kankali Tila, Mathura

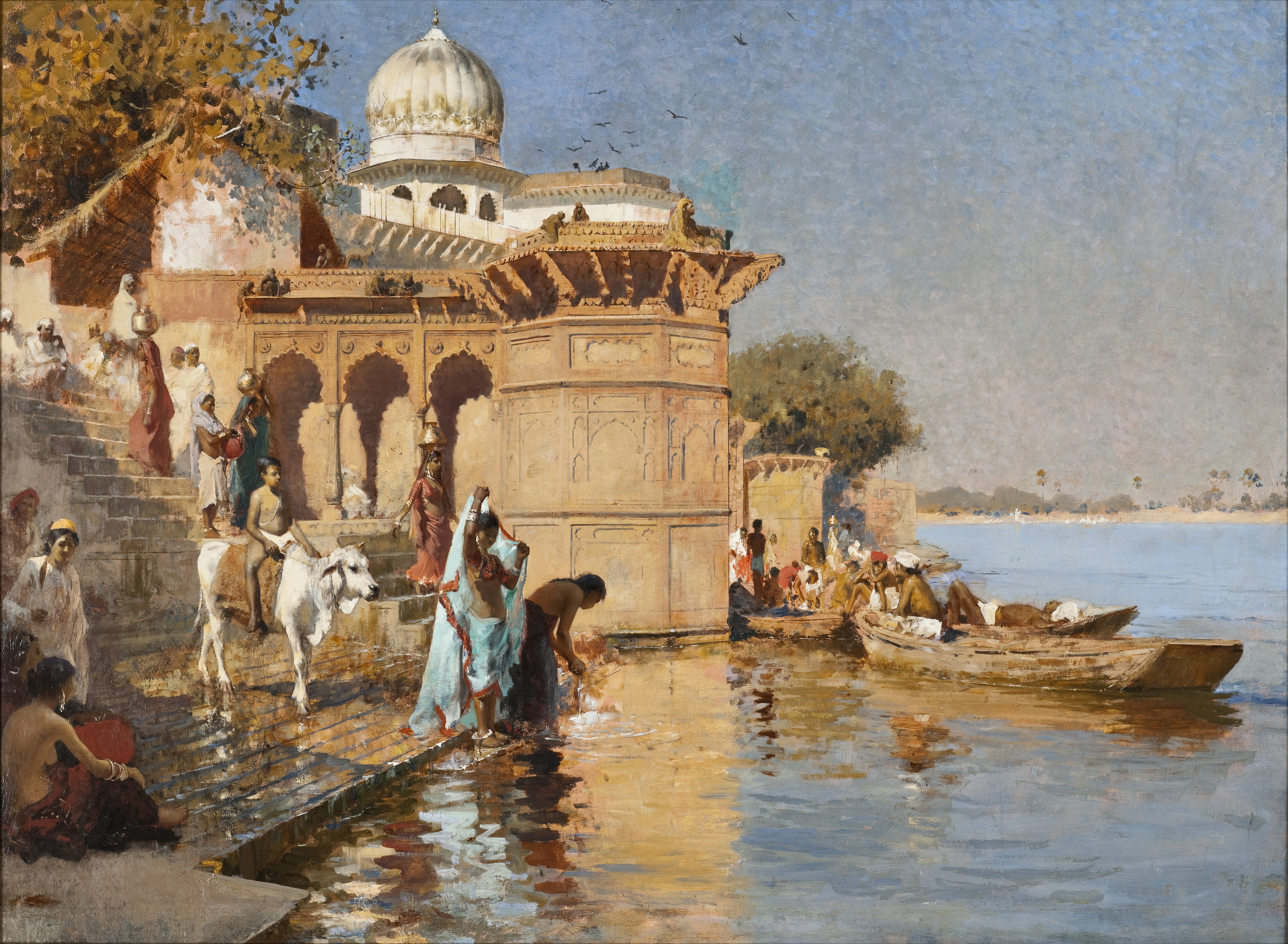
Along the Ghats of Mathura (c. 1880)

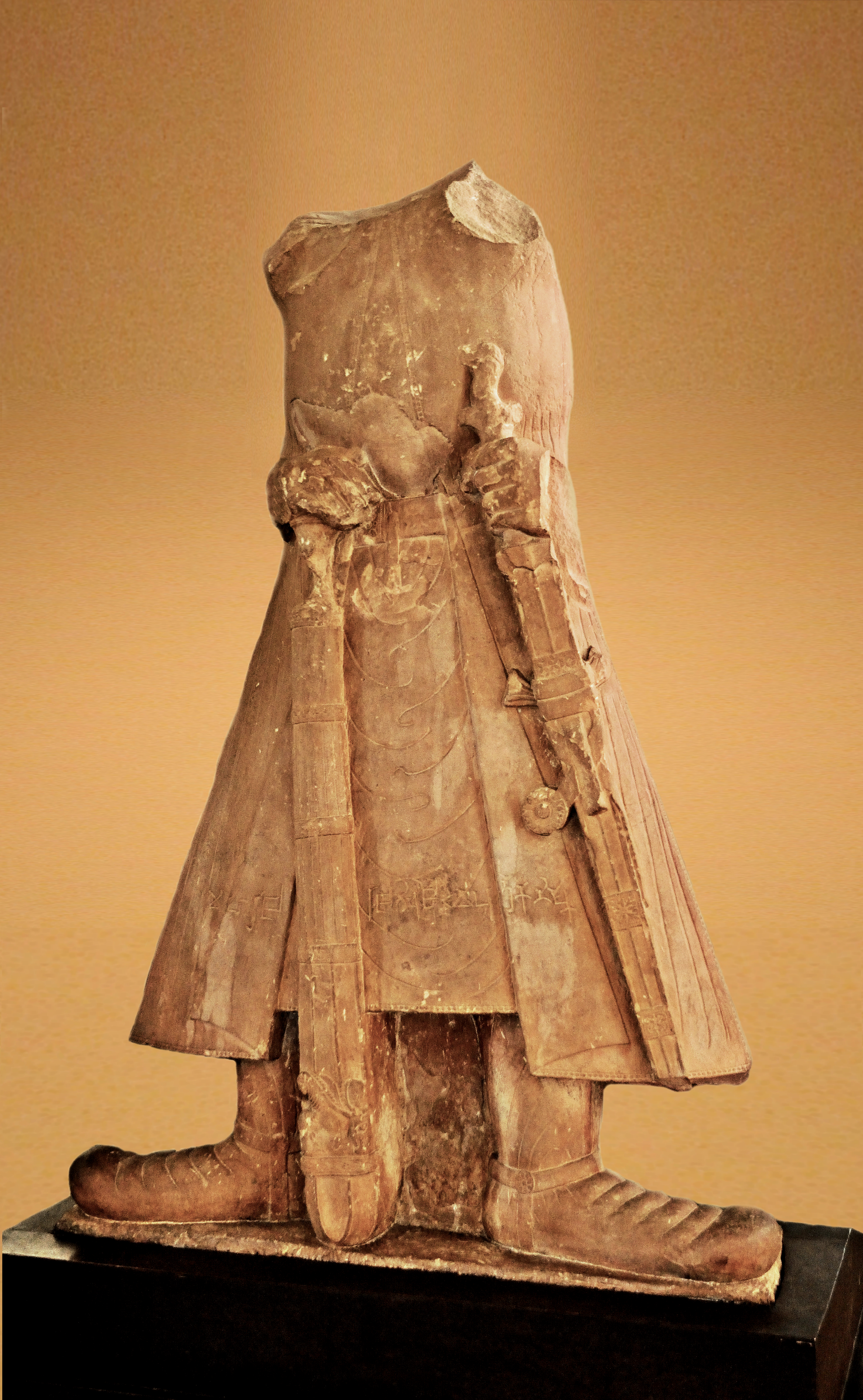
Statue of Kanishka I, second century CE, Mathura Museum

Sculpture of woman from ancient Braj-Mathura, c. second century CE

Mathura, which lies at the centre of the cultural region of Braj has an ancient history and is also believed to be the homeland and birthplace of Krishna, who belonged to the Yadu dynasty. According to the Archaeological Survey of India plaque at the Mathura Museum, the city is mentioned in the oldest Indian epic, the Ramayana. In the epic, the Ikshwaku prince Shatrughna slays a demon called Lavanasura and claims the land. Afterwards, the place came to be known as Madhuvan as it was thickly wooded, then Madhupura and later Mathura. The most important pilgrimage site in Mathura was Katra ('market place'), now referred to as Krishna Janmasthan ('the birthplace of Krishna'). Excavations at the site revealed pottery and terracotta dating to the sixth century BCE, the remains of a large Buddhist complex, including a monastery called Yasha Vihara of the Gupta period, as well as Jain sculptures of the same era.

=== Ancient history ===
Archaeological excavations at Mathura show the gradual growth of a village into an important city during the Vedic age. The earliest period belonged to the Painted Grey Ware culture (1100–500 BCE), followed by the Northern Black Polished Ware culture (700–200 BCE). Mathura derived its importance as a center of trade due to its location where the northern trade route of the Indo-Gangetic Plain met with the routes to Malwa (central India) and the west coast. Archaeologists have discovered a fragment of Mathura red sandstone from Rakhigarhi - a site of Indus Valley Civilisation dated to third millennium BCE - which was used as a grindstone; red sandstone was also a popular material for historic period sculptures.

By the sixth century BCE Mathura became the capital of the Surasena Kingdom. The city was later ruled by the Maurya empire (fourth to second centuries BCE). Megasthenes, writing in the early third century BCE, mentions Mathura as a great city under the name Μέθορα (Méthora). It seems it never was under the direct control of the following Shunga dynasty (2nd century BCE) as not a single archaeological remain of a Shunga presence were ever found in Mathura.

The Indo-Greeks may have taken control, direct or indirect, of Mathura some time between 180 BCE and 100 BCE, and remained so as late as 70 BCE according to the Yavanarajya inscription, which was found in Maghera, a town 17 kilometres (11 mi) from Mathura. The opening of the 3 line text of this inscription in Brahmi script translates as: "In the 116th year of the Yavana kingdom..." or '"In the 116th year of Yavana hegemony" ("Yavanarajya") However, this also corresponds to the presence of the native Mitra dynasty of local rulers in Mathura, in approximately the same time frame (150 BCE—50 BCE), possibly pointing to a vassalage relationship with the Indo-Greeks. Mathura emerged as one of the earliest centres of Jainism in India, as evidenced by archaeological findings at Kankali Tila, including Jain stupas, Tirthankara images and inscribed votive tablets (Ayagapata) dating back to at least the 2nd century BCE.

==== Indo-Scythians ====
After a period of local rule, Mathura was conquered by the Indo-Scythians during the first century BCE. The Indo-Scythian satraps of Mathura are sometimes called the "Northern Satraps", as opposed to the "Western Satraps" ruling in Gujarat and Malwa. However, Indo-Scythian control proved to be short lived, following the reign of the Indo-Scythian Mahakshatrapa ("Great Satrap") Rajuvula, c. 10–25 CE. The Mora Well inscription of Mahakshatrapa Rajuvula, of the early decades of the first century CE, found in a village seven miles from Mathura, stated that images pratima(h) of the blessed (bhagavatam) five Vrishni heroes, were installed in a stone shrine of a person called Tosa. The heroes were identified from a passage in the Vayu Purana as Samkarsana, Vasudev, Pradyumna, Samba, and Aniruddha. The English translation of the inscription read:-

. . . of the son of mahakṣatrapa Rāṃjūvula, svāmi . . . The images of the holy paṃcavīras of the Vṛṣṇis is... the stone shrine... whom the magnificent matchless stone house of Toṣā was erected and maintained... five objects of adoration made of stone, radiant, as it were with highest beauty...

The Mathura inscription of the time of Mahakshatrapa Rajuvula's son, Mahakshatrapa Sodasa recorded erection of a torana (gateway), vedika (terrace) and chatuhsala (quadrangle) at the Mahasthana (great place) of Bhagavat Vasudeva. Several male torsos representing the Vrisni heroes were also found in a shrine in Mora dating to the time of Mahakshatrapa Sodasa.

==== Kushan Empire ====
The Kushan emperors took control of Mathura some time after the Mahakshatrapa ("Great Satrap") Sodasa (reigned circa 15 CE), although several of his successors ruled as Kushan vassals, such as the Indo-Scythian Mahakshatrapa Kharapallana and the Satrap Vanaspara, both of whom paid allegiance to the Kushans, in an inscription at Sarnath, dating to the third year of the reign of the Kushan emperor Kanishka the Great c. 130 CE.

The Kushans made Mathura one of their capitals. (Preceding and/or concurrent capitals of the Kushans included Kapisa [modern Bagram, Afghanistan], Purushapura [modern Peshawar, Pakistan] and Takshasila [adjoining modern Taxila, Pakistan].)

Mathuran art and culture reached its zenith during the Kushan era. Perhaps the most famous example was the artistic style known as the Mathura school. Mathura ateliers were most active during the epoch of the great Kushan emperors Kanishka, Huvishka, Vasudeva whose reign represents the Golden Age of Mathura sculpture.

During the 3rd century CE, following the decline of the Kushan Empire, the Naga dynasty of Padmavati took control of Mathura.

==== Gupta Empire ====
In the reign of Chandragupta Vikramaditya, a magnificent temple of Vishnu was built at the site of Katra Keshavadeva. Kalidasa, hailed as the greatest poet and dramatist in Sanskrit, in the fourth-fifth century CE mentioned the groves of Vrindavan and Govardhan hill as:

...the king of Mathura, whose fame was acknowledged in song even by the devatas... At that moment, though still in Mathura, it appears as if Ganga has merged with Yamuna at the Sangam... In a Vrindavan garden which is superior even to Kubera's garden, known as Chaitra-ratha... You can, as well, during rains, look at the dancing peacocks, while sitting in a pleasant cave of the Goverdhan Mountain.

Chinese Buddhist Monk Faxian mentions the city as a centre of Buddhism about 400 CE. He found the people were very well off, there were no taxes other than for those on farmers who tilled the royal land. He found that people did not kill animals, no one consumed wine, and did not eat onion or garlic. He found that engraved title deeds were issued to land owners. Visiting priests were provided with accommodation, beds, mats, food, drinks and clothes to perform scholarly works.

==== Harsha Empire ====
Xuanzang, who visited the city in 634 CE, mentions it as Mot'ulo, recording that it contained twenty Buddhist monasteries and many Hindu temples. Later, he went east to Thanesar, Jalandhar in the eastern Punjab, before climbing up to visit predominantly Theravada monasteries in the Kulu valley and turning southward again to Bairat and then Mathura, on the Yamuna river.

=== Medieval History and Islamic Invasions ===
==== Early Middle Ages ====
The famous female Alvar saint, Andal visualised going to a pilgrimage which began at Mathura, then proceeded to Gokul, the Yamuna, the pool of Kaliya, Vrindavan, Govardhan, and finished at Dwarka. The eleventh century Kashmiri poet, Bilhana visited Mathura and Vrindavan after leaving Kashmir en route to Karnataka.

==== High Middle Ages ====
The city was sacked and many of its temples destroyed by Mahmud of Ghazni in 1018 CE. The capture of Mathura by Maḥmūd Ibn Sebüktegīn is described by the historian al-Utbi (Abu Nasr Muhammad ibn Muhammad al Jabbaru-l 'Utbi) in his work Tarikh Yamini as follows:

The wall of the city was constructed of hard stone, and two gates opened upon the river flowing under the city, which were erected upon strong and lofty foundations, to protect them against the floods of the river and rains. On both sides of the city there were a thousand houses, to which idol temples were attached, all strengthened from top to bottom by rivets of iron, and all made of masonry work; and opposite to them were other buildings, supported on broad wooden pillars, to give them strength.

In the middle of the city there was a temple larger and firmer than the rest, which can neither be described nor painted. The Sultan thus wrote respecting it :— " If any should wish to construct a building equal to this, he would not be able to do it without expending an hundred thousand thousand red dinars, and it would occupy two hundred years, even though the most experienced and able workmen were employed." Among the idols there were five made of red gold, each five yards high, fixed in the air without support. In the eyes of one of these idols there were two rubies, of such value, that if any one were to sell such as are like them, he would obtain fifty thousand dinars. On another, there was a sapphire purer than water, and more sparkling than crystal; the weight was four hundred and fifty miskals. The two feet of another idol weighed four thousand four hundred miskals, and the entire quantity of gold yielded by the bodies of these idols, was ninety-eight thousand three hundred miskals. The idols of silver amounted to two hundred, but they could not be weighed without breaking them to pieces and putting them into scales. The Sultan gave orders that all the temples should be burnt with naphtha and fire, and levelled with the ground.

The temple at Katra was sacked by Maḥmūd Ibn Sebüktegīn. A temple was built to replace it in 1150 CE. The Mathura prasasti (Eulogistic Inscription) dated Samvat (V.S.) 1207 (1150 CE), said to have been found in 1889 CE at the Keshava mound by Anton Fuhrer, German Indologist who worked with the Archaeological Survey of India, recorded the foundations of a temple dedicated to Vishnu at the Katra site:

Jajja, who carried the burden of the varga, together with a committee of trustees (goshtijana), built a large temple of Vishnu, brilliantly white and touching the clouds.

Jajja was a vassal of the Gahadavalas in charge of Mathura, and the committee mentioned in the prasasti could have been of an earlier Vaishnava temple. The temple built by Jajja at Katra was destroyed by the forces of Qutubuddin Aibak, though Feroz Tughlaq (r. 1351–88 CE) was also said to have attacked it. It was repaired and survived till the reign of Sikandar Lodi (r. 1489–1517 CE).

In the twelfth century, Bhatta Lakshmidhara, chief minister of the Gahadavala king Govindachandra (r. 1114–1155 CE), wrote the earliest surviving collection of verses in praise of the sacred sites of Mathura in his work Krtyakalpataru, which has been described as "the first re-statement of the theory of Tirtha-yatra (pilgrimage)". In his Krtyakalpataru, Bhatta Lakshmidhara devoted an entire section (9) to Mathura.

Later on the city was sacked again by Sikandar Lodi, who ruled the Sultanate of Delhi from 1489 to 1517 CE. Sikandar Lodi earned the epithet of 'Butt Shikan', the 'Destroyer of Idols'. Ferishta recorded that Sikandar Lodi was a staunch Muslim, with a passion for vandalising Hindu temples:

He was firmly attached to the Mahomedan religion, and made a point of destroying all Hindu temples. In the city of Mathura he caused masjids and bazaars to be built opposite the bathing-stairs leading to the river, and ordered that no Hindus should be allowed to bathe there. He forbade the barbers to shave the beards and heads of the inhabitants, in order to prevent the Hindus following their usual practices at such pilgrimages.

In Tarikh-i Daudi, of 'Abdu-lla (written during the time of Jahangir) said of Sikandar Lodi:

He was so zealous a Musulman that he utterly destroyed divers places of worship of the infidels, and left not a vestige remaining of them. He entirely ruined the shrines of Mathura, the mine of heathenism, and turned their principal Hindu places of worship into caravanserais and colleges. Their stone images were given to the butchers to serve them as meat-weights, and all the Hindus in Mathura were strictly prohibited from shaving their heads and beards, and performing their ablutions. He thus put an end to all the idolatrous rites of the infidels there; and no Hindu, if he wished to have his head or beard shaved, could get a barber to do it. Every city thus conformed as he desired to the customs of Islam.

Vallabhacharya and Chaitanya Mahaprabhu arrived in the Braj region, in search of sacred places that had been destroyed or lost. In Shrikrsnashrayah, that make up the Sodashagrantha, Vallabha said of his age:

The Malechchhas (non-Hindus in this context) have surrounded all the holy places with the result that they have become infected with evil. Besides, the holy people are full of sorrow. At such a time Krishna alone is my way.

==== Late Middle Ages ====
The Portuguese, Father Antonio Monserrate (1536 CE-1600 CE), who was on a Jesuit mission at the Mughal Court during the times of Akbar, visited Mathura in 1580–82, and noted that all temples built at sites associated with the deeds of Krishna were in ruins:-

It (Mathura) used to be a great and well populated city, with splendid buildings and a great circuit of walls. The ruins plainly indicate how imposing its buildings were. For out of these forgotten ruins are dug up columns and very ancient statues, of skilful and cunning workmanship. Only one Hindu temple is left out of many; for the Musalmans have completely destroyed all except the pyramids. Huge crowds of pilgrims come from all over India to this temple, which is situated on the high bank of the Jomanis (Yamuna)...

The Keshavadeva temple was rebuilt by the Bundela Rajput Rajah Vir Singh Deo at a cost of thirty-three lakh rupees when the gold was priced at around ₹ 10/- per tola. And the grand structure of the temple in Mathura was regarded a "wonder of the age".

The Mughal Emperor Aurangzeb, built the Shahi-Eidgah Mosque during his rule, which is adjacent to Shri Krishna Janmabhoomi believed to be over a Hindu temple. He also changed the city's name to Islamabad. In 1669, Aurangzeb issued a general order for the demolition of Hindu schools and temples, in 1670, specifically ordered the destruction of the Keshavadeva temple. Saqi Mustaid Khan recorded:

On Thursday, 27th January/15 Ramzan (27 January 1670)... the Emperor as the promoter of justice and overthrower of mischief, as a knower of truth and destroyer of oppression as the zephyr of the garden of victory and the reviver of the faith of the Prophet, issued orders for the demolition of the temple situated in Mathura, famous as the Dehra of Kesho Rai. In a short time by the great exertions of his officers, the destruction of this strong foundation of infidelity was accomplished and on its site a lofty mosque was built by the expenditure of a large sum... Praised be the august God of the faith of Islam, that in the auspicious reign of this destroyer of infidelity and turbulence, such a wonderful and seemingly impossible work was successfully accomplished.

On seeing this instance of the strength of the emperor's faith and the grandeur of his devotion to God, the proud Rajas were stifled, and in amazement they stood like images facing the wall. The idols, large and small, set with costly jewels, which had been set up in the temple, were brought to Agra, and buried under the step of the mosque of the Begum Shahib in order to be continuously trodden upon. The name of Mathura was changed to Islamabad.

The Muslim conquest resulted in the destruction of all Buddhist, Jain, and Hindu temples and monuments in and around Mathura. Buddhism, already in decline, never revived, and for the next four hundred years the Jains and Hindus were unable to erect any temples that were not sooner or later demolished. Many of the sites that had been places of religious importance were abandoned and gradually sank beneath the earth. But some of them were not forgotten, owing to the persistence of oral tradition, the refashioning of a temple into a mosque, or the presence of humble shrines, some of which housed sculptural fragments of earlier buildings. Several of them have survived as places of significance in the modern pilgrimage circuit.

"The rebellion in Mathurá district seems to have gained ground. 'On the 14th Rajab, 1080, [28 November 1669], his Majesty left Dihlí for Akbarábád, and almost daily enjoyed the pleasures of the chase. On the 21st Rajab, whilst hunting, he received the report of a rebellion having broken out at Mauza' Rewarah, Chandarkah, and Surkhrú. Hasan 'Ali Khán was ordered to attack the rebels at night, which he did, and the firing lasted till 12 o'clock the next day. The rebels, unable longer to withstand, thinking of the honour of their families, now fought with short arms, and many imperial soldiers and companions of Hasan ’Alí were killed. Three hundred rebels were sent to perdition, and two hundred and fifty, men and women, caught. Hasan ’Alí, in the afternoon, reported personally the result of the fight, and was ordered to leave the prisoners and the cattle in charge of Sayyid Zain ul-'Abidin, the jágirdár of the place. Çaf Shikan Khán also (who after ’Abdunnabí's death had been appointed Faujdár of Mathura) waited on the emperor, and was ordered to tell off two hundred troopers to guard the fields attached to the villages, and prevent soldiers from plundering and kidnapping children. Námdár Khán, Faujdár of Murádábád, also came to pay his respects. Çafshikan Khán was removed from his office, and Hasan 'Ali Khán was appointed Faujdár of Mathura, with a command of Three Thousand and Five Hundred, 2000 troopers, and received a dress of honour, a sword, and a horse. * * * On the 18th Sha'bán [1st January, 1670), his Majesty entered Agrah. Kokilá Ját, the wicked ringleader of the rebels of District*......, who had been the cause of ’Abdunnabí's death and who had plundered Parganah Sa'dábád, was at last caught by Hasan ’Alí Khán and his zealous peshkár, Shaikh Razíuddin, and he was now sent with the Shaikh to Agrah, where by order of his Majesty he was executed. Kokila's son and daughter were given to Jawahir Khán Nazir [a eunuch]. The girl was later married to Shah Quli, the well-known Chelah; and his son, who was called Fázil, became in time so excellent a Hafiz [one who knows the Qorán by heart], that his Majesty preferred him to all others and even chaunted passages to him. Shaikh Razíuddin, who had captured Kokila, belonged to a respectable family in Bhagalpur, Bihár, and was an excellent soldier, administrator, and companion; he was at the same time so learned, that he was ordered to assist in the compilation of the Fatáwá i 'Alamgiri [the great code of Muhammadan laws]. He received a daily allowance of three rupees.'+ (Haásir i ’Alamgiri, pp. 92 to 91.) Hasan ’Alí Khán retained his office from 1080 to Sha'bán 1087 (October, 1676), when Sulțán Qulí Khán was appointed Faujdír of Mathurá.", Asiatic Society of Bengal, Proceedings

=== Early Modern History ===
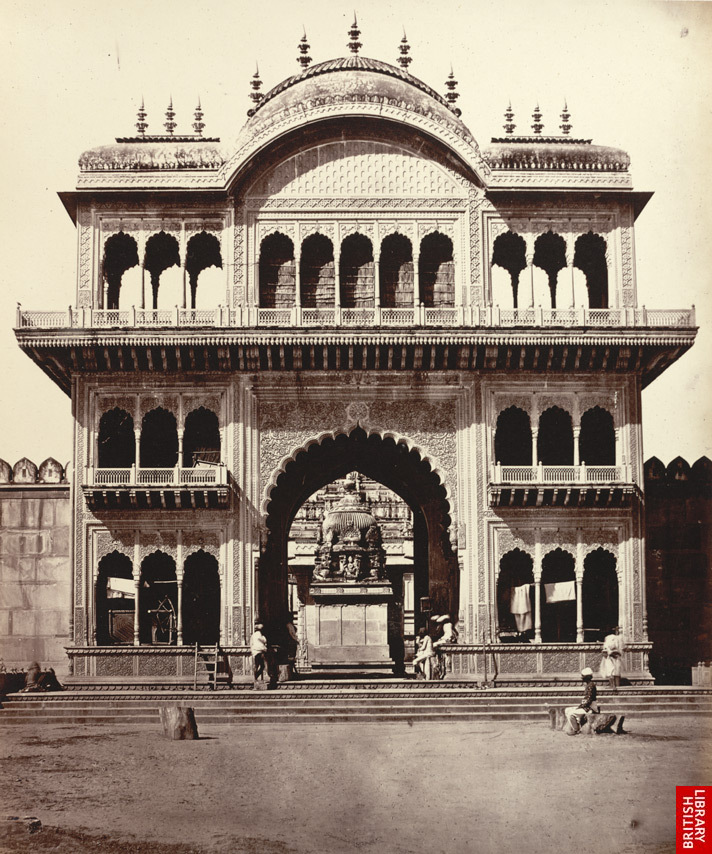
Gate of Shet Lukhmeechund's Temple, a photo by Eugene Clutterbuck Impey, 1860s

According the biographer of Raja Jai Singh, Atmaram, when Jai Singh was campaigning against the Jat Raja Churaman Singh, he bathed at Radha kund on the full moon of Kartik, went to Mathura in the month of Shravan in 1724, and performed the marriage of his daughter on Janmashtami. He then undertook a tour of the sacred forests of Braj, and, on his return to Mathura, founded religious establishments and celebrated Holi.

==== Pilgrimage by the Family of Peshwa of Maratha Empire ====
During the period of the expansion of Maratha Empire, pilgrimage to the holy places in the north became quite frequent. Pilgrims required protection on the way and took advantage of the constant movement of troops that journeyed to and back from their homeland for military purposes. That is how the practice arose of ladies accompanying military expeditions. The mother of Peshwa Balaji Baji Rao, Kashitai performed her famous pilgrimage for four years in the north, visiting Mathura, Prayag, Ayodhya, Banaras, and other holy places.

== Religious heritage ==
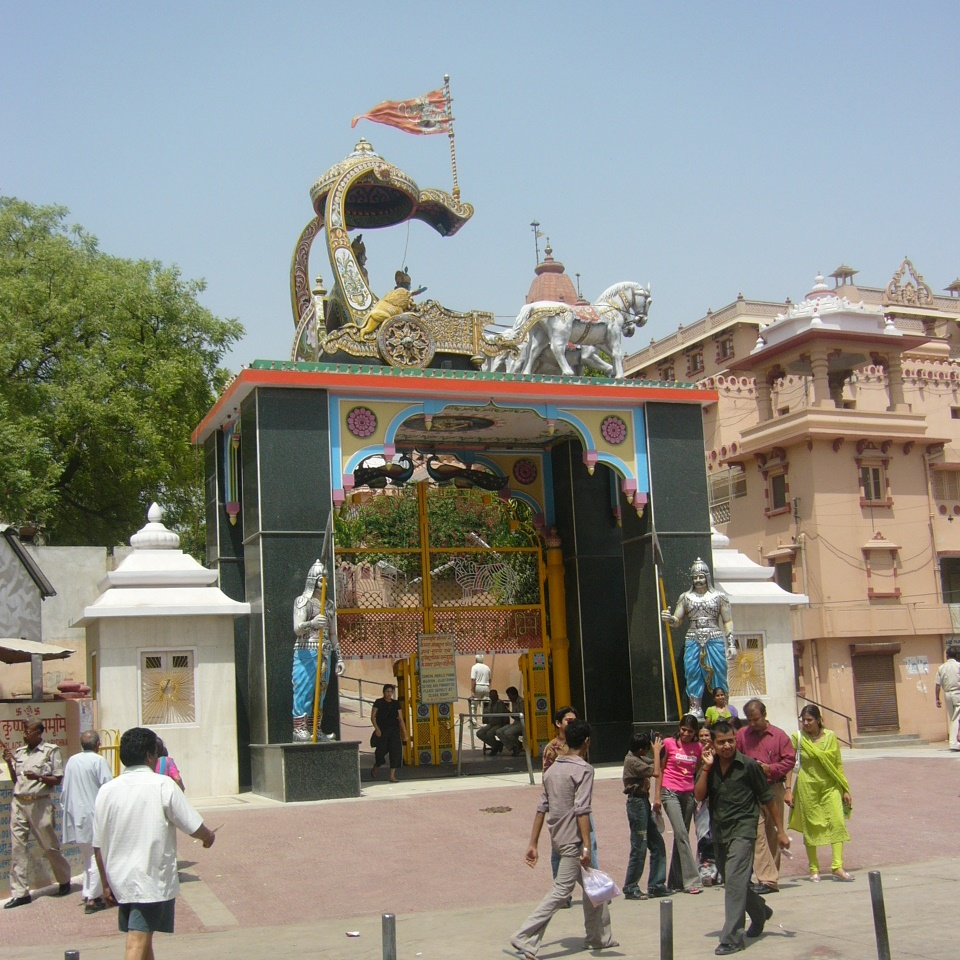
Entrance to the Shri Krishna Janmabhoomi temple complex

Mathura is a holy city in Hinduism and is considered the heart of Brij Bhoomi, the land of Krishna. The twin-city to Mathura is Vrindavan.

There are many places of historic and religious importance in Mathura and its neighbouring towns.

Krishna Janmasthan Temple Complex is an important group of temples built around what is considered to be the birthplace of Krishna. The temple complex contains Keshav Deva temple, Garbha Griha shrine, Bhagavata Bhavan and the Rangabhoomi where the final battle between Krishna and Kamsa took place.

The Dwarkadheesh Temple is one of the largest temples in Mathura. Vishram Ghat at the bank of river Yamuna is said to be the place were Krishna had rested after killing Kamsa.

Other notable Hindu religious sites and heritage locations includes the Gita Mandir, Govind Dev temple, ISKCON temple, Kusum Sarovar, Naam yog Sadhna Mandir, Peepleshwar Mahadeo Temple and Yum Yamuna Temple

Kankali Tila brought forth many treasures of Jain art. The archaeological findings testify the existence of two Jain temples and stupas. Numerous Jain sculptures, Ayagapatas (tablet of homage), pillars, crossbeams and lintels were found during archaeological excavations. Some of the sculptures are provided with inscriptions that report on the contemporary society and organisation of the Jain community.

Most sculptures could be dated from the second century BC to the 12th century CE, thus representing a continuous period of about 14 centuries during which Jainism flourished at Mathura. These sculptures are now housed in the Lucknow State Museum and in the Mathura Museum.

The Mathura Museum is notable for archaeological artefacts, especially those from the Kushan and Gupta empires. It has sculptures associated with Hinduism, Buddhism and Jainism.

== Festivals ==
Krishna Janmashtami is grandly celebrated every year in Mathura. Every year 3 to 3.5 million devotees celebrate Janmashtami in Mathura, with the maximum number of devotees visiting the Keshav Deva temple and the Dwarkadheesh temple. Devotees generally observe a fast and break it at midnight when Krishn was born. Devotional songs, dance performances, bhog and aartis are observed across Mathura-Vrindavan.

== Culinary tradition ==
Mathura along with the twin city of Vrindavan, (both of which are associated with Shri Krishna) are main centers of Braj Cuisine. Mathura is known for its Mathura Peda, Mathura Lassi, Mathura Heeng Kachori, Mathura Chaat, Moong Dal Cheela, Bedmi puri and Dubki Aloo Jhol.

== Geography ==
Mathura is located at 27.28°N 77.41°E. It has an average elevation of 174 metres (570 feet).

=== Climate ===
Mathura has a hot semi-arid climate (BSh), a little too dry to be an humid subtropical climate (Koppen: Cwa), under the Köppen climate classification.

Climate data for Mathura (1981–2010, extremes 1974–1995)
Month	Jan	Feb	Mar	Apr	May	Jun	Jul	Aug	Sep	Oct	Nov	Dec	Year
Record high °C (°F)	29.6 (85.3)	34.1 (93.4)	40.1 (104.2)	45.1 (113.2)	47.1 (116.8)	47.6 (117.7)	44.6 (112.3)	42.7 (108.9)	40.6 (105.1)	42.1 (107.8)	35.1 (95.2)	30.1 (86.2)	47.6 (117.7)
Mean daily maximum °C (°F)	21.3 (70.3)	24.4 (75.9)	30.4 (86.7)	36.6 (97.9)	41.2 (106.2)	41.2 (106.2)	36.1 (97.0)	34.6 (94.3)	34.2 (93.6)	33.3 (91.9)	29.1 (84.4)	23.3 (73.9)	32.1 (89.8)
Mean daily minimum °C (°F)	6.4 (43.5)	8.3 (46.9)	13.2 (55.8)	17.9 (64.2)	23.9 (75.0)	25.9 (78.6)	25.5 (77.9)	25.0 (77.0)	23.5 (74.3)	18.3 (64.9)	11.6 (52.9)	7.7 (45.9)	17.3 (63.1)
Record low °C (°F)	1.0 (33.8)	0.5 (32.9)	5.0 (41.0)	7.0 (44.6)	8.5 (47.3)	17.0 (62.6)	11.5 (52.7)	17.5 (63.5)	17.6 (63.7)	11.5 (52.7)	4.0 (39.2)	2.0 (35.6)	0.5 (32.9)
Average rainfall mm (inches)	10.4 (0.41)	13.6 (0.54)	6.8 (0.27)	10.1 (0.40)	17.8 (0.70)	35.5 (1.40)	164.7 (6.48)	205.2 (8.08)	165.0 (6.50)	18.0 (0.71)	3.9 (0.15)	9.0 (0.35)	660.1 (25.99)
Average rainy days	0.9	1.3	1.0	0.9	1.5	3.0	9.0	9.1	4.9	0.9	0.3	1.1	33.9
Average relative humidity (%) (at 17:30 IST)	65	59	53	48	39	43	67	72	71	63	56	60	58
Source: India Meteorological Department

== Demographics ==
Religions in Mathura City (2011)
Religion	Percent
Hinduism	81.54%
Islam	17.22%
Others†	1.24%

The 2011 census of India estimates the population of Mathura to be 441,894, with a decadal growth rate of 22.53 per cent. Males account for 54% (268,445) and females for 46% (173,449) of this population. Sex ratio of Mathura is 858 females per 1000 males, which has increased from 840 (2001). However, national sex ratio is 940. Population density in 2011 has increased from 621 per km^{2} in 2001 to 761 per km^{2}. Mathura has an average literacy rate of 72.65 per cent which has increased from 61.46 per cent (2001) but still lower than the national average of 74.04 per cent. Male and female literacy rate are 84.39 and 58.93 per cent respectively. 15.61 per cent of Mathura's population is under 6 years of age. This figure was 19.56 per cent in 2001 census.

=== Languages ===
According to the 2011 census on Mathura NPP, 95.4% of the people identified as Hindi speakers, 2.6% as Urdu speakers and 1.4% as speakers of Braj Bhasha (the local dialect). The city also lies within the cultural region of Braj.

== Government and politics ==
Actress turned politician, Hema Malini is the sitting MP of the Mathura constituency in Uttar Pradesh, currently serving her third consecutive term since 2014.

== Transportation ==
=== Rail ===
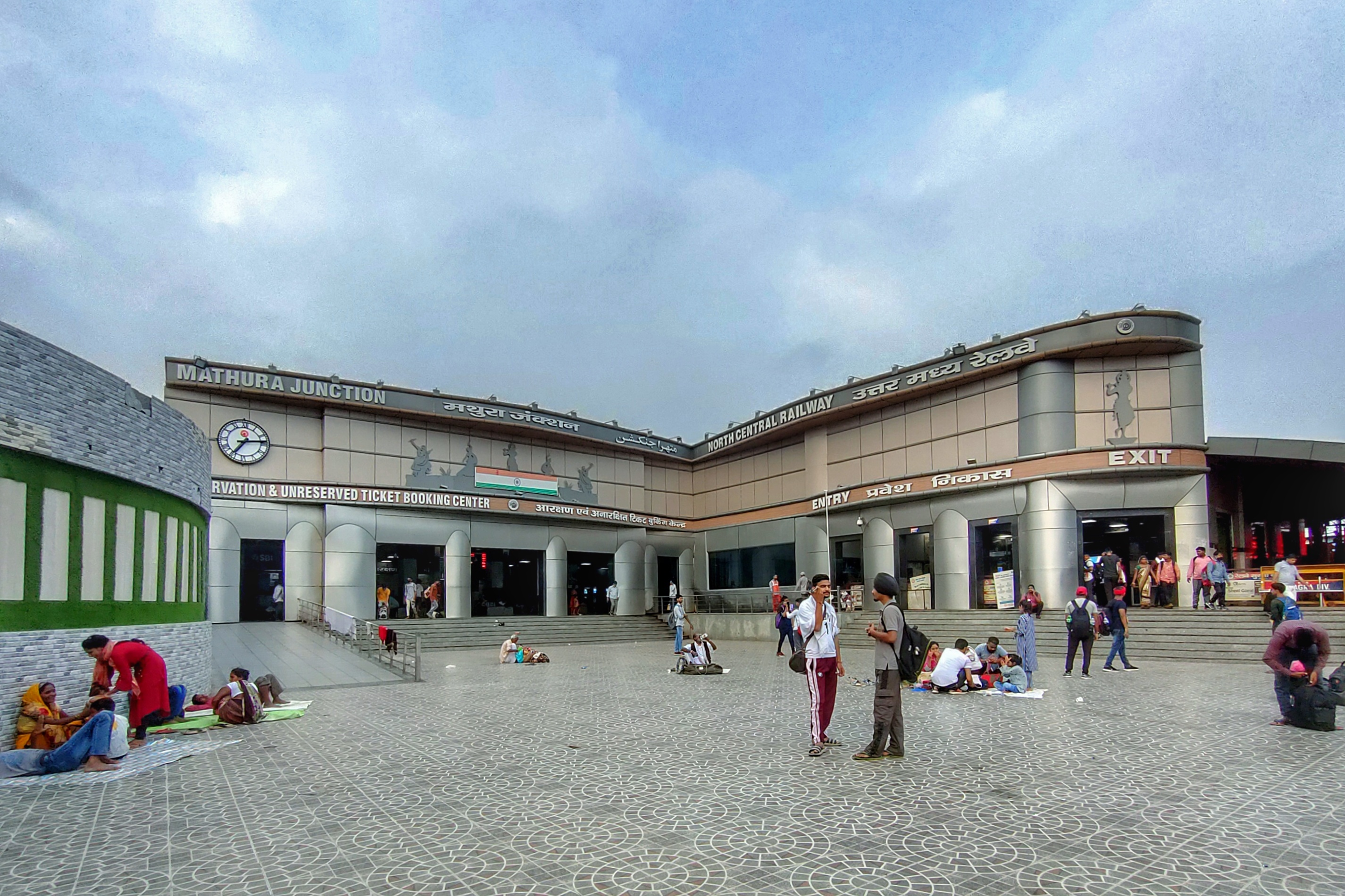
Mathura Junction railway station lies on the Delhi-Mumbai rail route.

Mathura Junction railway station is situated on the major Delhi-Mumbai rail route. Both Central Railway and Western Railway routes pass through Mathura. Trains from NCR (north-central railway) to ER (eastern railway) also pass through the Mathura junction. Mathura Cantt railway station is a major route for eastern and central railway.

Important trains that originate/terminate at Mathura are:

- 12177/Howrah – Mathura Chambal Express.

=== Road ===
Mathura is well-connected by road to the rest of India. National Highway NH-19(previously NH-2) from Delhi to Kolkata, with diversion for Chennai also passes through Mathura. Yamuna Expressway from Greater-Noida to Agra (165 km 6 lane access controlled express highway) also passes through, providing good connectivity to Noida, Agra, Kanpur and Lucknow.

=== Tram ===
A tram network has been proposed in the city, which would make Mathura the second only city in India (besides Kolkata) to have a functional tram transport. In 2017, the local MLA Shrikant Sharma announced that the trams will be operational in Mathura and Vrindavan by 2018.

=== Air ===
Currently the city has no airport. The nearest airports are the Agra Airport (about 60 km away) , Noida International Airport (about 95 km away) and the Delhi Airport (about 160 km away) with major national and international air routes. Land has been earmarked, and construction is in progress near the Yamuna Expressway, with plans to open in the next five years with regular flights to major national and international air routes in future.

In 2012, the then civil aviation minister Ajit Singh suggested Mathura's name for the site of a new greenfield international airport to the then chief minister of Uttar Pradesh, Akhilesh Yadav. Mathura's name came to note when a group of ministers terminated the plan of building Taj International Airport at Agra.

== Strategic importance ==
I Corps (Strike Formation) within the Indian Army's Central Command is based in Mathura, hosting Strike I Corps headquarters in a large classified area in the outskirts of the city known as Mathura Cantonment (Central Command is headquartered in Lucknow). It hosts Strike Infantry units, air defence units, armoured divisions, engineer brigades, artillery Units, and classified units of Strategic Forces Command. The I Corps is primarily responsible for the western borders of India. In 2007 during Exercise Ashwamedha, all the armoured, artillery, and infantry divisions performed a simulation of an overall NBC (nuclear-chemical-biological) environment. The aim was to show operational ability in high intensity, short duration and 'sudden' battle.

== Industries ==
Mathura Refinery located in the city is one of the biggest oil refineries of Asia with a refining capacity of 8.0 million tonnes per year. This oil refinery of Indian Oil Corporation Ltd. is a technologically advanced oil refinery and provides local employment opportunities as well. Its main focus is to meet the demands from the NCR. The refinery had undertaken projects to upgrade its diesel and gasoline units to bring Sulphur levels down by nearly 80 per cent.

== Media and communications ==
The city has a local station of the All India Radio.

== Educational institutions ==
- Krishna Mohan Medical College and Hospital
- GLA University
- Rashtriya Inter College Surir
- Sachdeva Institute of Technology
- Sanskriti University
- U.P. Pt. Deen Dayal Upadhyaya Veterinary Science University and Cattle Research Institute

== Notable people ==
- Jitendra Malik, Indian-American academic who was involved in computer vision

== See also ==
- Mathur (disambiguation)
- Brij Bhoomi
- Gokul
- Nandgaon
- Goverdhan
- Sonkh
