= Mathur-II =

- village
- Country: India
- State: Kerala
- District: Palakkad

Population (2011)
  - Total: 12,147

Languages
  - Official: Malayalam, English
- Time zone: UTC+5:30 (IST)
- PIN: 6XXXXX
- Vehicle registration: KL-

Mathur-II is a village in the Palakkad district, state of Kerala, India. It forms a part of the area administered by Mathur gram panchayat.

== Demographics ==
As of 2011 India census, Mathur-II had a population of 12,147 with 5,942 males and 6,205 females.
