= Mathur-I =

- village
- Country: India
- State: Kerala
- District: Palakkad

Population (2011)
  - Total: 12,975

Languages
  - Official: Malayalam, English
- Time zone: UTC+5:30 (IST)
- PIN: 678571
- Vehicle registration: KL-49

Mathur-I is a village in the Palakkad district, state of Kerala, India. It forms a part of the area administered by the Mathur gram panchayat.

== Demographics ==
As of 2011 India census, Mathur-I had a population of 12,975 with 6,296 males and 6,679 females.
