= Sheep station =

Landholding for raising sheep

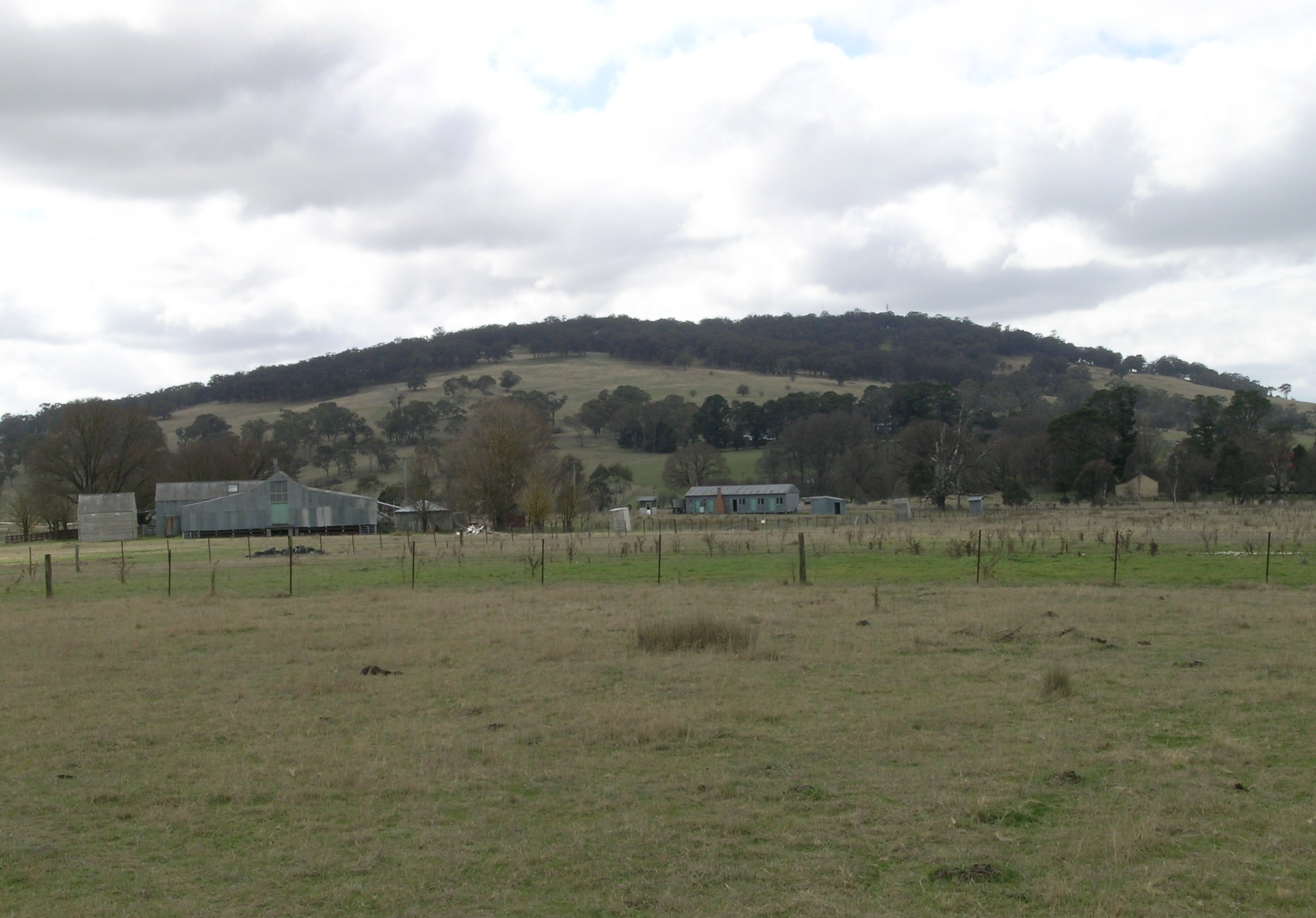
Shearing shed, meat house and shearers' quarters, on a station, Northern Tablelands, New South Wales, Australia

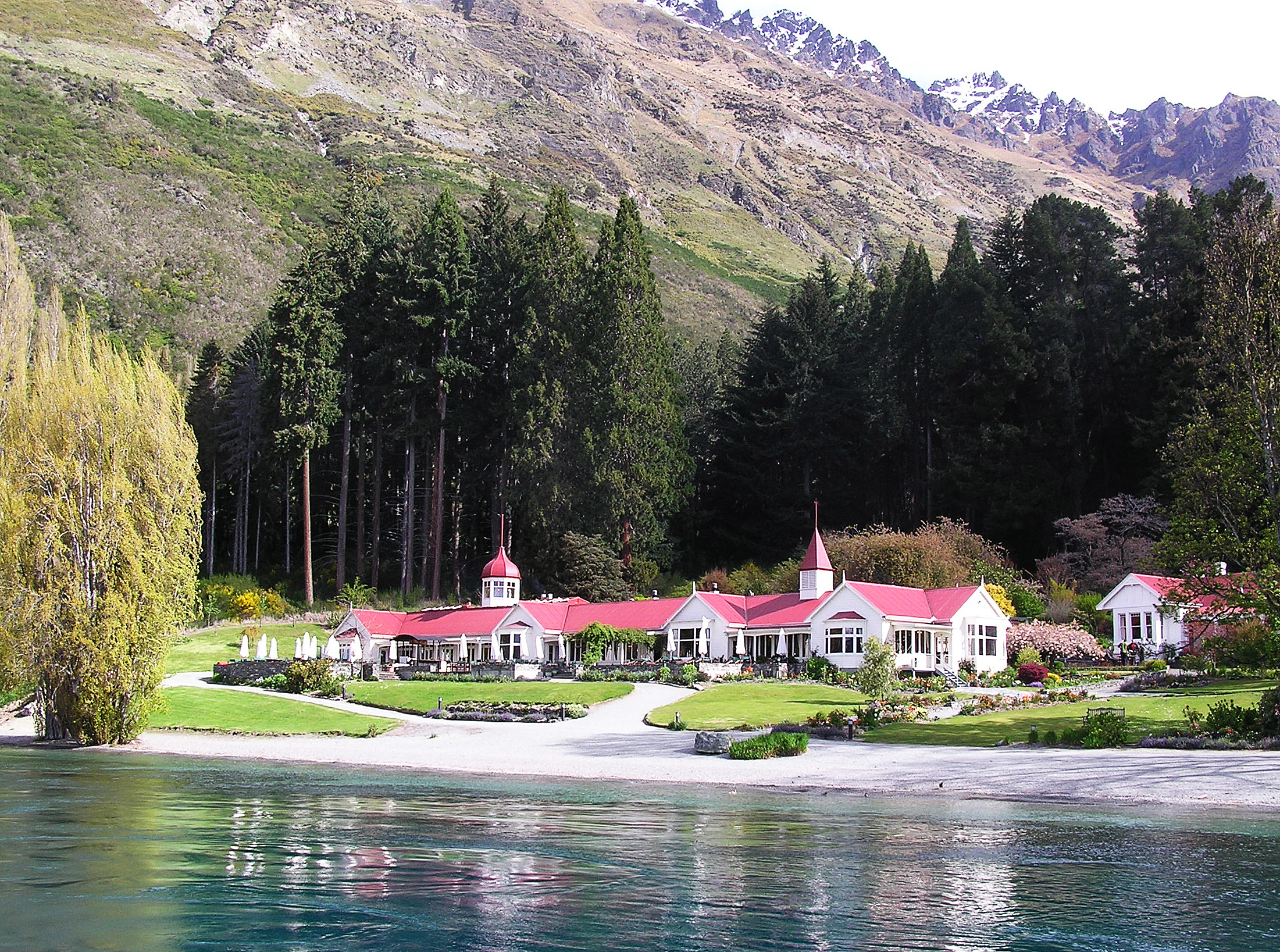
Walter Peak sheep station, South Island, NZ

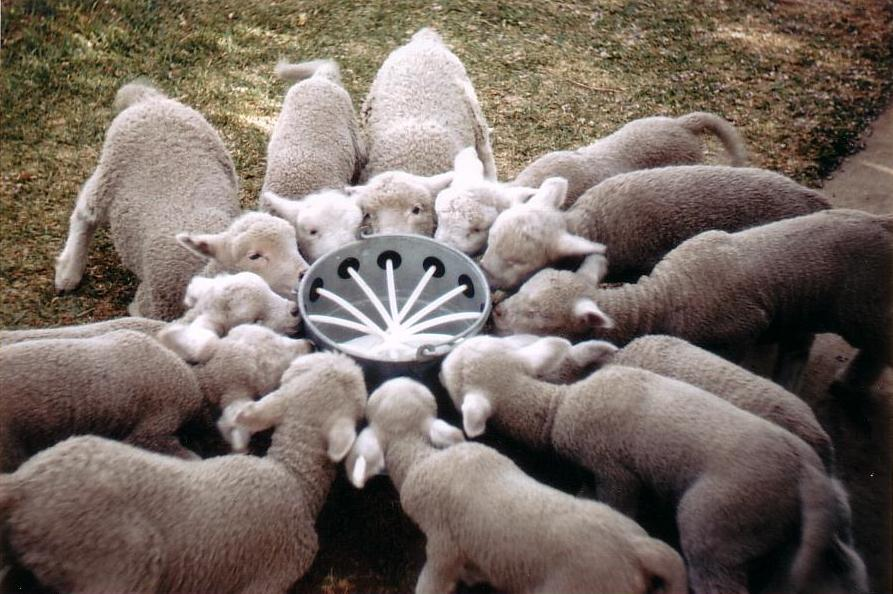
Poddy lambs (orphaned lambs) drinking milk at a sheep station in rural Australia

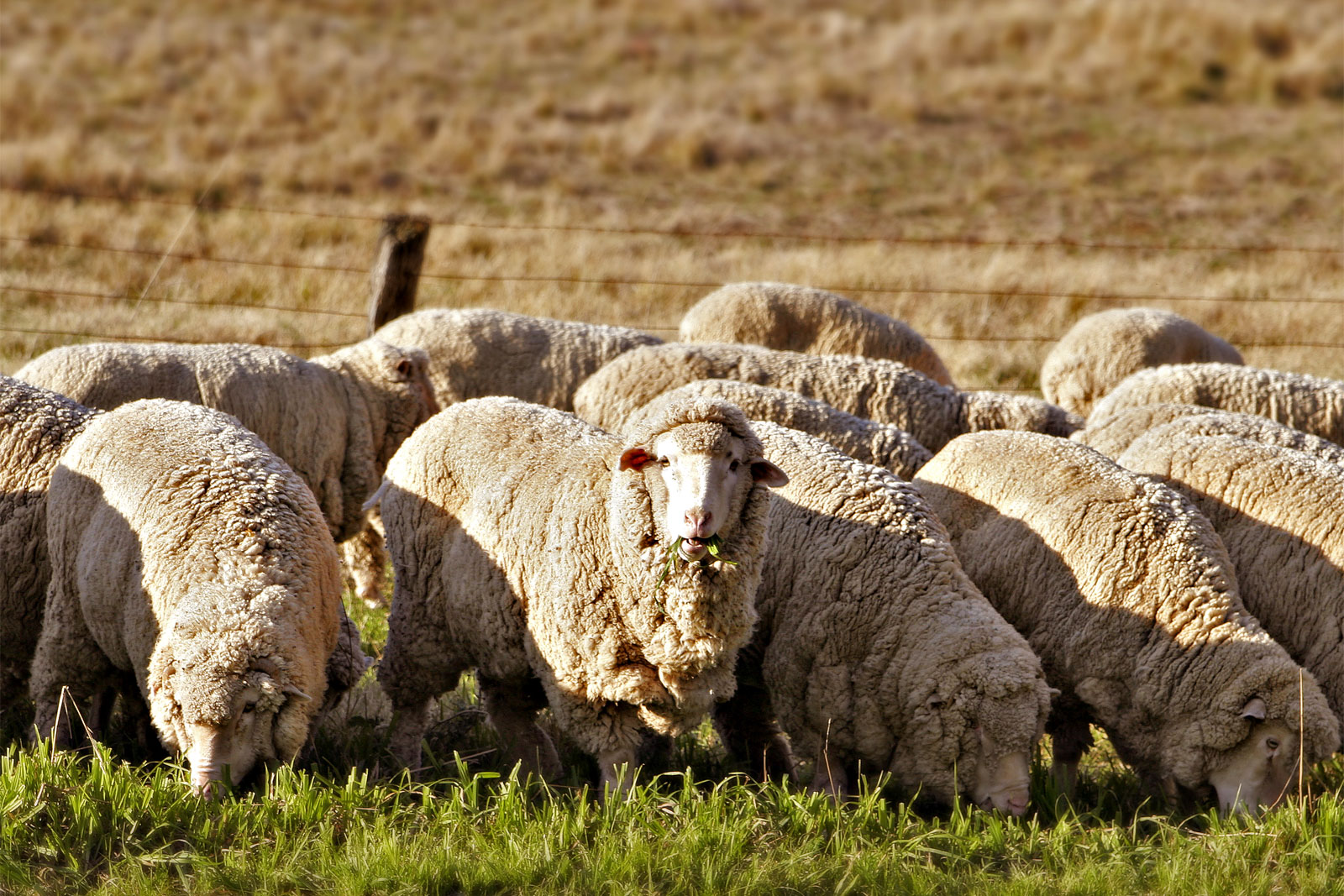
Sheep grazing in rural Australia

A sheep station is a large property (station, the equivalent of a ranch) in Australia or New Zealand, the main activity of which is the raising of sheep for their wool and/or meat. In Australia, sheep stations are usually in the south-east or south-west of the country. In New Zealand the Merinos are usually in the high country of the South Island. These properties may be thousands of square kilometres in size and run low stocking rates to be able to sustainably provide enough feed and water for the stock.

In Australia, the owner of a sheep station may be called a pastoralist, a grazier, or formerly a squatter (as in "Waltzing Matilda"), when their sheep grazing land was referred to as a sheep run.

== History ==
Sheep stations and sheep husbandry began in Australia when the British colonisers started raising sheep in 1788 at Sydney Cove.

== Improvements and facilities ==
In the Australian and New Zealand context, shearing involves an annual muster of sheep to be shorn, and the shearing shed and shearers' quarters are an important part of the station. A station usually also includes a homestead, adjacent sheds, windmills, dams, silos and in many cases a landing strip available for use by the Royal Flying Doctor Service and other light aircraft.

Historically, an outstation was a subsidiary homestead or other dwelling on Australian sheep or cattle stations that was more than a day’s return travel from the main homestead. Although the term later came to be more commonly used to describe a specific type of Aboriginal settlement, also known as a homeland community, it is still used on large cattle and sheep stations today, for example Rawlinna sheep station.

== Management and operation ==
Where the climate and vegetation allow, especially north of the dog fence, cattle stations are similar but run beef cattle rather than sheep. Some properties are not exclusively sheep or cattle stations but may have a mix of cattle, sheep, cropping and even goats which makes the owner less vulnerable to changes in wool or beef prices.

Management practices vary according to the location of the station and the season being experienced. For instance, drought necessitates decisions concerning the sale of stock or provision of supplementary feeding.

Routine procedures include supervising crutching, mating, shearing, treating for ticks, lice and maggots (if necessary), lambing and lamb marking. Lambs are weaned at about five months of age. Drenching for internal parasites is an important routine on a sheep station.

Other activities include ram buying and classing the sheep in order to determine the inferior types that are to be culled.

Crops and pastures are often also grown to provide additional feed for the sheep, especially those that will be raised and sold as prime lambs. Fences require regular inspections to locate and repair any damage that has been found. Sheep breeders may also need to undertake predatory animal control if crows, dingos or foxes are likely to be a problem.

== Terminology ==
The term "sheep run" was commonly used during the early settlement period to describe an unfenced tract of land operated by squatters, later used of a large station property, fenced or unfenced.

For administrative purposes, many stations exist on pastoral leases, but in state government jurisdictions they are increasingly known as stations.

The term "playing for sheep stations" is used to denote a large or serious game, usually in the expression "we're not playing for sheep stations".

== Examples ==
Rawlinna Station in Western Australia is the largest sheep station in Australia, covering about 10,117 square kilometres (3,906 sq mi) or 2.5 million acres.

Walter Peak is a notable old sheep station that was founded in 1860 on the south shore of Lake Wakatipu, South Island, New Zealand. It is 13 kilometres (8.1 mi) across Lake Wakatipu from Queenstown, 40 minutes steaming time on the historic TSS Earnslaw steamship.

== In literature ==
Two well-known nineteenth-century authors have written about life on a sheep station:

- Lady Barker Station Life in New Zealand and Station Amusements in New Zealand.
- Samuel Butler A First Year in the Canterbury Settlement and his novel Erewhon.

== See also ==
- Cattle station
- List of pastoral leases in Western Australia
- List of ranches and stations
- Pastoral lease
- Rangeland#Australia
- Sheep husbandry
- Sheep shearing
- Station (Australian agriculture)
- Station (New Zealand agriculture)
- Stockman (Australia)
