= Mathra, Kerala =

Mathra
- village
- Location in Kerala, India Mathra (India)
- Coordinates: 8°59′0″N 76°54′40″E
- Country: India
- State: Kerala
- District: Kollam

Languages
  - Official: Malayalam, English
- Time zone: UTC+5:30 (IST)
- PIN: 691333

Mathra is a village in Kollam district in the Indian state of Kerala, located near the town of Punalur. It is the headquarters of Mathra Grama Panchayat, a fertile area in which many residents are engaged in farming.. It is surrounded by hills, and several streams flow through village.

Mathra is a big village constituting many temples, including Mathra Ayiravalli Temple (Lord Shiva) and Paravathi Devi Temple. It also has one school - Saraswathi Villasam School. Mathra Service Co-operative Bank is a large cooperative bank in the district. The village has a large NRI population. Most of the needs of the village are contributed by the nearby town Punalur. Jai Bharath library is a cultural centre in Mathra.

== Transport ==
Many Kerala State Road Transport Corporation buses ply through Mathra, connecting village to Punalur and other nearby places. Private vehicles including jeeps and autos also connect Mathra to Punalur.
