= Shyam Sunder =

Shyam Sunder or Shyam Sundar may refer to:

- Shyamasundara, a name of Krishna
- Shyamasundara, an Indian male given name
- Shyamsundar, a village in West Bengal, India
  - Shyamsundar railway station
  - Syamsundar College
- Shyam Sundar (academic), Indian academic and professor
- Shyam Sundar (1932 film), an Indian Marathi-language film
- Shyam Sundar (1940 film), an Indian Tamil-language film
- Shyam Sunder (economist) (born 1944), accounting theorist and experimental economist
- Shyam Sunder, detective protagonist in Telugu-language books written by Indian writer Madhu Babu
- B. Shyam Sunder (1908–1975), Indian intellectual and public figure
- S. Shyam Sunder, lead investigator of the Collapse of the World Trade Center
- Shyam Sundar Besra, Indian writer
- Shyam Sundar Chakravarthy (1869–1932), Indian revolutionary
- Shyamsundar Dagdoji Shinde, Indian politician
- Shyam Sunder Das (1932–1981), Indian politician
- Shyam Sunder Goenka (born 1932), Indian entrepreneur
- Shyam Sundar Goswami, Indian classical singer
- Shyam Sundar Gupta, Indian politician
- Shyam Sundar Hembram, Indian writer
- Shyam Sunder Jyani, Indian environmentalist
- Shyam Sunder Kapoor (born 1938), Indian nuclear physicist
- Shyam Sundar M. (born 1992), Indian chess grandmaster
- Shyam Sunder Patidar, Indian politician from Madhya Pradesh
- Shyam Sunder Rao, Indian volleyball player
- Shyam Sunder Sharma (born 1952), Indian politician
- Shyam Sunder Surolia (1920–2001), Indian freedom fighter
- Shyam Sundar Swami, Indian para Olympian

== See also ==
- Shyam (disambiguation)
- Sunder (disambiguation)
- Shyamsundarpur (disambiguation)
- Singhari Shyamsundar Kar, Indian musician
