= Shyam =

Shyam is a name of Krishna and an Indian masculine given name and surname. Notable people with this name include:

Shyam

- Shyam (actor) (1920–1951), Indian Hindi film actor
- Shyam (composer) (born 1937), an Indian music composer from Kerala
- Shyam Benegal (1934–2024), Indian film director
- Shyam Satardekar (born 1966), Indian politician
- Shyamasundara, a name of Krishna
- Shyamasundara, an Indian male given name
- Shyam Sundar (film), a 1940 Indian film
- Shyamsundar, a village in West Bengal, India
  - Shyamsundar railway station
  - Syamsundar College
- Shyam Sundar, Indian academic
- Shyam Sunder (economist) (born 1944), accounting theorist and experimental economist
- Shyam Sunder, detective protagonist in Telugu-language books written by Indian writer Madhu Babu
- B. Shyam Sunder (1908–1975), Indian intellectual and public figure
- S. Shyam Sunder, lead investigator of the Collapse of the World Trade Center
- Shyam Sundar Besra, Indian writer
- Shyam Sundar Chakravarthy (1869–1932), Indian revolutionary
- Shyamsundar Dagdoji Shinde, Indian politician
- Shyam Sunder Das (1932–1981), Indian politician
- Shyam Sunder Goenka (born 1932), Indian entrepreneur
- Shyam Sundar Goswami, Indian classical singer
- Shyam Sundar Gupta, Indian politician
- Shyam Sundar Hembram, Indian writer
- Shyam Sunder Jyani, Indian environmentalist
- Shyam Sunder Kapoor (born 1938), Indian nuclear physicist
- Shyam Sundar M. (born 1992), Indian chess grandmaster
- Shyam Sunder Patidar, Indian politician from Madhya Pradesh
- Shyam Sunder Rao, Indian volleyball player
- Shyam Sunder Sharma (born 1952), Indian politician
- Shyam Sunder Surolia (1920–2001), Indian freedom fighter
- Shyam Sundar Swami, Indian para Olympian
- Karam Shyam (born 1962), Indian politician

Syam

- Syam Pushkaran (born 1984), Indian scriptwriter
- Syam Sudhakar (born 1983), Malayalam-language poet

== See also ==
- Shyam (film), 2016 Indian Malayalam-language film
- Sam (given name)
