= Biz2credit =

Online financing platform for small businesses

Biz2Credit
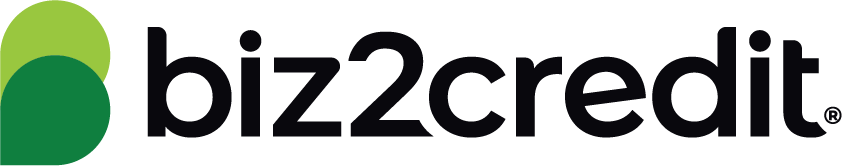
- Type: Private
- Industry: Financial services
- Founded: 2007; 19 years ago
- Founder: Rohit Arora, Ramit Arora
- Headquarters: New York, USA and Noida, India
- Area served: USA, UK, India, Australia
- Key people: Rohit Arora (co-founder & CEO); Ramit Arora (co-founder & President)
- Website: www.biz2credit.com

Biz2Credit is an online financing platform for small businesses. The company provides direct funding to small businesses across the United States. The company is known for its financing products, educational resources for business such as the BizAnalyzer, and research that it publishes periodically, including the Small Business Lending Index, and its subsidiary SaaS business lending platform Biz2X.

== History ==
Biz2Credit was founded in 2007 by Ramit Arora and Rohit Arora as an online financial platform in the alternative lending industry. While the company began initially as a provider of Marketplace lending for businesses, in 2013 the company changed its approach and to offer financing directly to its clients.

The company's investors include Nexus Venture Partners and Tata Capital. In 2014, the company received a $250 million commitment from direct lending investment to expand its small business financing facility.

In 2019 Biz2Credit secured $50 million in Series B funding.

The company launched its SaaS (software-as-a-service) lending platform, Biz2X, in 2019, and rebranded it in 2020.

Biz2Credit launched the CPA portal in partnership with CPA.com. The platforms also launched PPP Loan Forgiveness Tool in July 2020.

In response to the COVID-19 pandemic, the company launched an online forum virtual event series with members of Congress in 2020. The company also launched pppforgivenesstool.com to help small business owners secure loan forgiveness on their PPP Loans and ensure they could maintain adequate cash flow.

In December 2020, Biz2Credit announced taking pre-applications for the new round of the PPP.

== Services ==
Biz2Credit offers online business financing services through three financial products: term loans, working capital financing, and commercial real estate loans. Financing rates are based on the borrower's financial metrics and their online financing applications completed on Biz2Credit.com. The company does not offer other banking services beyond loans and financing.

== Operations ==
Biz2Credit is headquartered in New York City, NY. Biz2Credit uses Amazon Web Services machine learning to automate the loan process by extracting text and data from documents.

The company frequently publishes proprietary research that is used by journalists, data scientists and industry trade groups to assess the financial performance of small businesses. Periodic research reports include the Annual Women-Owned Business Study, Latino-Owned Business Study, Top 25 Small Business Cities Report and Small Business Industries Report.

== FTC settlement ==
In March 2024 Biz2Credit settled a Federal Trade Commission complaint over its handling of Paycheck Protection Program loans, agreeing to pay $33 million. The FTC said the company had told applicants it would process their loans in 10 to 14 business days when the wait typically ran past a month, and that it had not returned money to applicants it rejected. A parallel case against Womply settled for $26 million. The FTC described the two payments as the largest it had won under Section 19 of the FTC Act.

== Clients ==
- 2016, Tata Capital
- 2018, HSBC Bank
- 2018, Tally Solutions
- 2019, Andromeda

== Awards ==
- Best Places to Work in Fintech (American Banker)
- 2021 Finovate Award: Excellence in Pandemic Response
- Biz2X – IBS Intelligence (IBSi) Global Fintech Innovation Award
- Top 100 Best Midsize Companies to Work in NYC in 2021
