= Shyam Sundar =

Shyam Sundar may refer to:

- Shyam Sundar (academic), Indian academic and professor
- Shyam Sundar (1932 film), an Indian Marathi-language film
- Shyam Sundar (1940 film), an Indian Tamil-language film
