= B. Shyam Sunder =

Indian lawyer

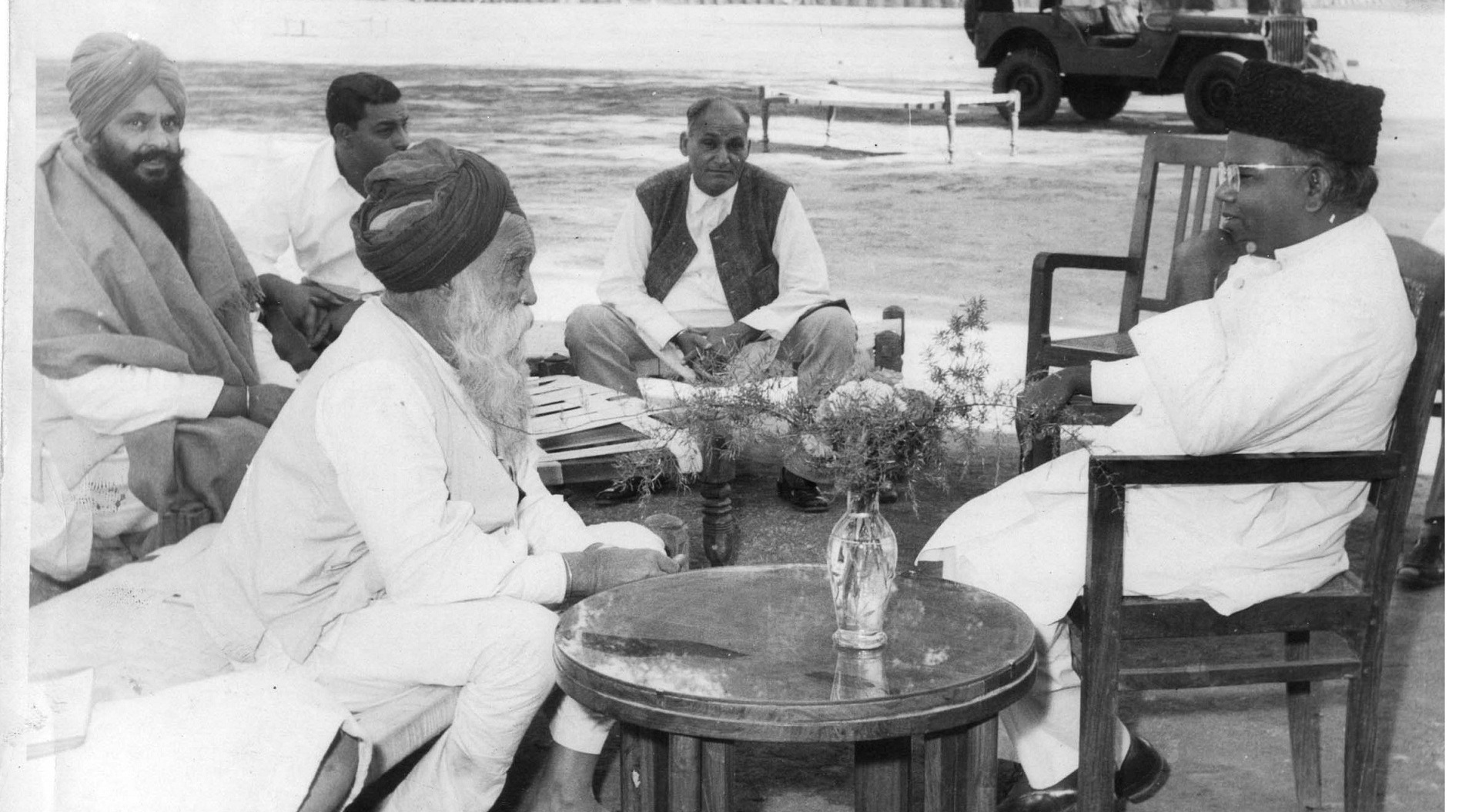
- B. Shyam Sunder(R) with Tara Singh(L)
- Born: 21 December 1908; Aurangabad, Hyderabad State
- Died: 19 May 1975 (aged 66); Hyderabad
- Resting place: Hyderabad
- Education: B.A. LL.B
- Alma mater: Osmania University
- Occupation: lawyer
- Organization: Bhim Sena
- Title: Quied-e-Pushthkhome
- Movement: Eradication of Untouchability,
- Parent(s): B. Manicham (father); Sudha Bai (mother)
- Awards: Khusro-e-Deccan

B. Shyam Sunder (21 December 1908 – 19 May 1975) was a political thinker, jurist, prolific writer, parliamentarian and a revolutionary leader. He was born in Aurangabad district in Hyderabad State, British India. In 1915, he moved to Hyderabad with his father, B. Manicham, who was a railway employee.

== Early life and education ==
Sunder was born into Mala family at Aurangabad Cantonment, Aurangabad district, Maharashtra. It was then a part of the Nizam of Hyderabad's princely state. He completed his schooling at Aurangabad. He was greatly effected by caste ill-feelings and the practice of untouchability, which took him to Buddha's Ajanta Caves to seek solace. When his family moved to Hyderabad, he enrolled in the Osmania University, graduating in political science, economics, and later did a law degree.

Sunder could speak Urdu, English and Marathi. He was elected as Senate and Syndicate member of the Osmania University. He entered active politics and joined the student wing of Depressed Classes Association. He was chosen as General Secretary and later became its president in 1947.

In 1937, Sunder founded the Dalit-Muslim unity movement at Parbhani in Aurangabad, Maharashtra and urged his people to join hands with Muslims. He was a legislator representing Andhra Pradesh and Mysore State.

In 1956, Sunder established the "All India Federal Association of Minorities" at Hyderabad. In 1968, he organised a movement for Bahujans at Lucknow district in Uttar Pradesh State and formally declared the Minorities slogan, "India is ours." He inaugurated "Bhim Sena", a voluntary corps force, at Gulbarga in Karnataka State which later spread to all parts of India. V. T. Rajshekar, an eminent Dalit scholar, writer and editor for Dalit Voice, credited Sunder as the Father of Dalits Movements in India.

== Political career ==
Sunder practiced law briefly and joined the Swadeshi movement under the leadership of Smt Sarojini Naidu, serving as its General Secretary to Andhra Pradesh. He was elected as the President of the Literary Society of Hyderabad. He also accepted the membership of the Exhibition Society to Hyderabad. He was elected unopposed from Graduate Constituency to Hyderabad Legislative Assembly, and later served as its Deputy Speaker.

Sunder was a part of the Nizam's delegation to the United Nations. P. R. Venkat Swamy, who authored Our Struggle for Emancipation, says "the entry of Shyam Sunder is a red day in the history of Depressed Class Movement" and mentions he was fondly addressed as Queid-e-Pusthakhome ('Leader of Depressed Class'). The Nizam of Hyderabad conferred Khusro-e-Deccan, highest civilian award, on Shyam Sunder for his yeoman service. V. T. Rajsheker, editor for Dalit Voice and an eminent Dalit writer, gives a graphic picture of Shyam Sunder and achievement of Bhim Sena.

== Sociopolitical work ==
Shyam Sunder was a social-political and ideological leader of the Mool Bharathis the during pre- and post-independence period. He was able to alleviate the conscience of his brethren by making them realise they are not untouchable but the Mool Bharathis of India; they are born Buddhist and builders of Harappan civilization and heir apparent to rule this land. He strove to provide education facilities and fought for land reforms for his brethren. He spearheaded a movement to federate Minorities and Bahujans to fight for their legitimate constitutional rights.

=== Views on the caste system ===
Hinduism has a practice of "untouchability", wherein certain people, including the Dalit caste, are considered untouchable. The Father of Nation, Sri Mahatma Gandhi, fondly said they are Harijan, meaning sons of God. The Constitution of India declared they are Scheduled Castes and Scheduled Tribes, and human rights activists say they are Dalit. Shyam Sunder, from the beginning of his political career, bluntly refuted this, saying "We are not Hindus, we have nothing to do with the Hindu caste system, yet we have been included among them by them and for them." He also said that Caste system is to them by them and for them.

=== Dalit-Muslim unity movement ===
At the "All India Depressed Classes Association" conference on 30–31 May 1941 at Parbhani in Aurangabad District, held under his presidency, Shyam Sunder said: "Change! Change swiftly; if you do not change now you will never change!" He laid the foundation for the Dalit-Muslim Unity Movement. It was decided in the conference that the "untouchables" should abandon all the traditional occupational practices and free themselves from untouchability and the caste system.

Sunder read sixty-four pages of a printed presidential address known as Khutbe-e-Sadarat and asked his people to raise a banner of militant revolt against the caste system and join hands with the Muslims: he was a passionately pro-Muslim leader. It turned out to be a social-cultural movement and has contributed to the sociology of development. He was the apostle of Dalit-Muslim unity movement in India. Sheetal Markan's Blog it has contributed for political awareness between both communities. Indeed, it is a great document in the history of untouchables movement, he detailed the history of Mool Bharathis, Indus valley civilization; a Dravidian civilization, Advent of Aryans in India; Origin of caste system, are Mool Bharthis are adherent of Hinduism, and Aryans (Brhamins) usurpation of power from Mool Bharathis.

== Contribution to education ==
In 1932, His Highness the Nizam of Hyderabad set up the "One Crore Rupees Education Trust Fund": Shyam Sunder was a trustee member for three years. To avoid caste ill-feeling among students, the trust opened Madarsa-e-Pushthkhome schools, residential hostels, and to combat school dropout it distributed monthly scholarships and even clothes to the students. This kind of education system was not found elsewhere in India.

Dr. B. R. Ambedkar started the People's Educational Society at Aurangabad; Shyam Sunder as a trustee member gave twelve 1.2 million rupees as a grant and five lakhs to establish Sidharth Law college at Bombay Nizam of Hyderabad, and personally gave two hundred acres of land to the Society. With these donations, Milind College, the first PES institution at Aurangabad, was established. Shyam Sunder served as Executive Council Member to the Society from 1964 to 1966.

The Mool Bharathi B. Shyam Sunder Memorial Society was formed after the death of Shyam Sunder. The society has published his books and assists research students in various universities.

== Land Reforms ==
Shyam Sunder realised that land alone could bring a qualitative-quantitative change in the lives of his brethren. P. R. Venkat Swamy recalls that he organized a mammoth rally of landless peasants at Hyderabad. He demanded land reforms from Nizam's State government, asking his followers to encroach on government-held "Gairan" land and even surplus lands of landed gentry. Dalits occupying agricultural lands belonging to the Government and privately held properties were first noticed in this part of India. He proposed many amendments to land reform bills in the Karnataka Assembly, but the feudal mentality was an obstacle to successful land reform; thus, he went to the extent of demanding a Mool Bharathi State "Dalitastan".

== Address to the UN Security Council ==
Sunder was part of the Nizam's delegation to the United Nations Security Council. He was the first post-independence leader who addressed the UN Security Council. As a sole representative of the 9 million Depressed Classes, he formed a part of the delegation and took advantage of his presence among the representatives of world nations. He gave the Security Council a clear picture of the embittered strife between groups and inhuman conditions of the suppressed masses of independent India. His comparison of the situation of the Depressed Classes of India to the racial segregation in the United States created an impression in the world diplomatic parlors. He was given a place of honor as the true representative of sixty million "untouchables", "Unapproachable", "Unseeable" and "Unshadowable" people.

The Indian government's Operation Polo—wherein the Nizam signed an accession treaty with the government—occurred, and Shyam Sunder cut short his European tour and returned to India. He was kept under house arrest at his sister's house in Pune and later freed. He renewed his political activities and contested the first General Election from Chanchal Guda constituency from Hyderabad, which he lost. He was later elected to Mysore Legislative Assembly from Bhalki constituency in Bidar district.

In 1962, he contested for an Assembly seat from Åland constituency in Kalaburagi district, and Lok Sabha seat from Bidar district, but lost both elections. After the demise of Dr. Ram Manohar Lohia, Sunder became the president of Praja Socialist Party.

== Minorities Movement ==
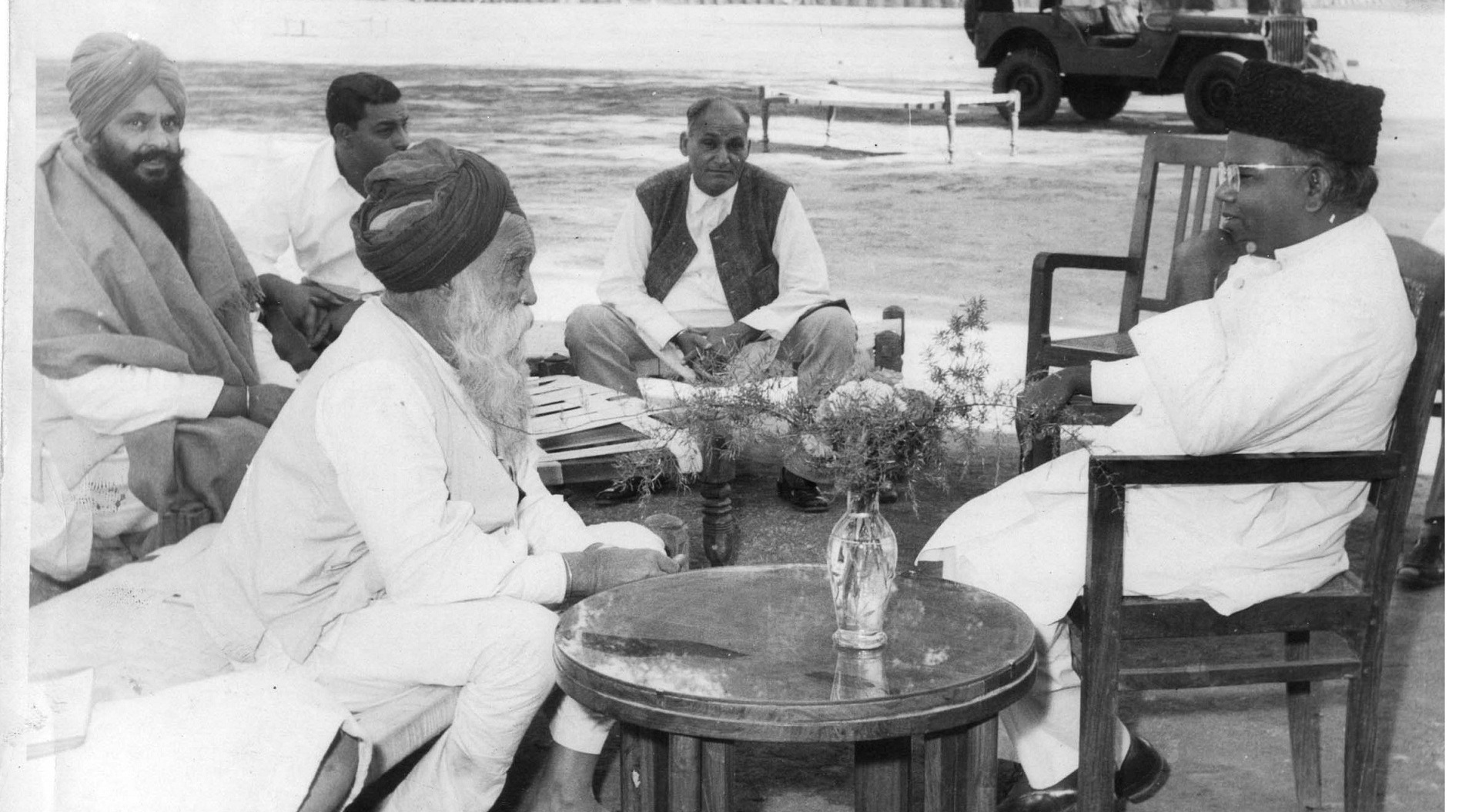
Minorities Movement

With the blessings of Sardar Master Tara Singh, on 13 October 1956, Shyam Sunder formed "All India Federal Association of Minorities" at Hyderabad. Shyam Sunder also wrote the pamphlet Federation is a must for Indian Minorities; his demands for Minorities included enforcement of their Constitutional rights, preservation of culture, electoral reforms, and even nationalisation of Administration Problems of India Minorities.

His main objectives were to undertake a nationwide educative campaign in favor of secularism, to ensure that minorities were not denied their constitutional rights, and a fair deal in recruitment for civil and military appointments and admissions to educational and technical institutions. Articles 29 and 30 of the constitution of India (part III) were implemented in letters as well as in spirit so far as the minorities are concerned. He warned minorities that "the alternative before the minorities is federate or face a lingering death." (National Integration and Problems of Minorities) He specifically suggested safeguards such as effective representation of minorities in Parliament and Legislature, safety of their life and culture, and reiterated the re-organisation of states; further, he said prejudice and discrimination against minorities hurts the country more than its victims.

=== Four demands ===
On 26 January 1968, a conference of "All India Scheduled Caste Federation" conference was held at Nanded District in Maharashtra State under the Presidency of Shyam Sunder. He stated that the practice of Apartheid is a racial one, and untouchability is religious in nature. The "ghetto apartheid" had been in operation for three thousand years in India, in spite of India's Constitutional provisions for Scheduled Caste, which had made no differences in the practice of untouchability and they are living in burning furnace and conference also decided to co-ordinate all political parties.

The federation put forth Four Demands based on the four immediate needs of 12 crore suppressed human beings in India: separate settlement, separate election for them, establishment of a separate University at Milind college in Aurangabad or Siddharth College at Bombay, and lastly, form an education trust funded by the government of India. The conference also demanded that the Marathwada University should be named after B. R. Ambedkar.

== Bhim Sena ==
Sunder created Bhim Sena, a voluntary corps force, on 29 April 1968 in Gulbarga district in Karnataka on the seventy-seventh anniversary of the birth of Dr. B. R. Ambedkar. He gave Ambedkars name to Bhim Sena, a self-defense movement based on truth and non-violence. It repulsed atrocities of the Hindu caste system on the untouchables. A militant force comprised about 2,00,000 Dalits, the movement was a revolt against the caste system. Shyam Sunder wished to create Dalitastan, a country for Untouchables, and desired an alliance between the Dalits, the Muslims, and the Untouchables. For this reason, Bhim Sena became popular. The Bhim Sena movement was a caste struggle rather than a class struggle, to confront Hindus militarily. The main objectives of Bhim Sena were three-fold: twenty-five percent villages to be surrendered to them, a separate electorate, and separate elections, and a separate University for them.

=== Organisation ===
Bhim Sena was intended to be organised on a district wise basis. The blue Flag of the Bhim Sena had the following design: in the centre, a white shining sun in which was a likeness of the plough, the hammer, and the arrow in red colour representing peasants, workers and the traves. The plough also indicated that the Scheduled Castes are the principal producers of food, the hammer indicated that they are the power behind all industrial activities, while the arrow shows that it is they who once ruled India. The main object of Bhim Sena was the powers of self-defence, with subsidiary activities like preparing for census and election work, The Legal Aid Committee, Adult education.

== Bahujans Movement ==
Shyam Sunder held a conference concerning Scheduled Caste, Minorities, Backward Classes and other Minorities Convention at Lucknow district in Uttar Pradesh on 12 and 13 October 1968. Periyar E. V. Ramasamy, Dr. Fareedi, Bhante Bhadat, and Anand Kausalyayan attended. In his presidential address, he put forth several demands; he demanded the remodeling of paramilitary forces, division of bigger states like Uttar Pradesh, Rajasthan, Madhya Pradesh, Maharashtra, Andhra and Bihar into two or more states. He also advocated that Minorities should be treated as corporate entities and be given autonomy to conduct their own affairs.

With one voice it declared the aqhliyataoun ka Nara Hindustan hamara. "From the platform of this convention, held in Lucknow noted for its refined composite Hindustani culture. I call upon the oppressed minority’s f the great land to wake up and unite; I warn them that if they do not, they would be annihilated one by one, group by group and section by section. And declare that united they constitute the majority and have the natural right to play an effective role in guiding the destination of the land of their birth and I conclude by expressing on my own behalf and on behalf of this convention our profound devotion to our mother land Ahliyataouna ka nara Hindustan Hamara. In fact, this movement at Lucknow was a precursor to the Bahujan movement started by Sri Kanshi Ram.

== Appeal to the UN ==
Shyam Sunder sought the UN’s intervention to form a separate country for untouchables, and appealed for a plebiscite to elucidate the desires of members of the Scheduled Caste in regards to remaining in Hinduism. Similarly, in his book, They Burn, he says:

"The United Nations organisation and The Charter on Human Rights does provide some remedy for millions and millions of human beings. who are thus condemned to the inhuman and barbarous condition peculiar to the Untouchables of India numbering one hundred and sixty Millions. Article 13 (B) and 55 (C) of the United Nations Charter deserve study by all champions of the exploited and the downtrodden The possibility of invoking Article 36-2- of the Statue of The International Court of Justice needs to be studied by all friends of the oppressed".

== Books by B. Shyam Sunder ==
=== Mool Bharathis ===
- They Burn: the 16,00,00,000 untouchables of India
- The four immediate needs of twelve crores suppresses human beings in India : resolutions passed unanimously
- Veda Mecum for Mool Bharatis
- Bhim Sena kya Chahati hai (Urdu)
- Problems of Scheduled Caste
- Harijans and General Elections
- Neo-Buddhist Claims as Scheduled Caste
- The Plight of Scheduled Caste in India Petition to Lok Sabha
- National Integration and Problems of Indian Minorities
- Danger Ahead for Minorities let us Unite and Face them
- Federation is a Must for Indian Minorities
- Problems of Indian Minorities

=== On Bahujans ===
- Presidential Address Uttar Pradesh Minorities and Backward Classes Convention (English, Urdu and Hindi)
- Khutebe-e-Sadarat, Parbhani Presidential Address in (Urdu)
- Deeksha (Hindi, Urdu and English)
- Bhoodevataon ka Manifesto (Hindi, Kannada and Urdu)
- Educational conference at Hyderabad (Urdu)
- Zionist Plot to Dominate the World
- Today's Muslims are Tomorrows Harijans
- Interview to Meherab Urdu Digest

=== On Hinduism ===
- Bhudevataon ka Manifesto (Hindi and Kannada)
- UDHR Must be Honored in India
- The Menace of the Dragon
