= Shyamsundarpur (disambiguation) =

Shyamsundarpur refers to a village refers to a village in East Singhbhum district, Jharkhand, India.

It can also refer to:

- Shyamsundarpur Patna, a village in Purba Medinipur district, West Bengal, India
- Shyamsundarpur, Chanditala-I, a village in Hooghly district, West Bengal, India
- Shyamsundarpur, Paschim Bardhaman, a village in Paschim Bardhaman district, West Bengal, India

== See also ==
- Shyam Sunder (disambiguation)
