= Bharat Goenka =

Indian businessman

- Born: Bharat Goenka; 7 August 1961 (age 65); Calcutta, West Bengal, India
- Occupation: Entrepreneur
- Board member of: Tally Solutions
- Parent: Shyam Sunder Goenka
- Awards: Padma Shri (2020)

Bharat Goenka (born 07 August 1961) is an Indian businessman and the co-founder and managing director of Tally Solutions. In 2020, he received the Padma Shri from the Government of India for his contribution in the field of trade and industry.

== Biography ==
Goenka is the son of Shyam Sunder Goenka, and is an alumnus of the Bishop Cotton Boys' School. A graduate in mathematics, Goenka co-founded Tally Solutions with his father in 1986 after searching for a software to manage their accounting books. He created an MS-DOS based accounting application named Peutronics Financial Accountant, formally changed to Tally Solutions in 1999.

In 2011, NASSCOM conferred their Lifetime Achievement Award to Goenka and the title of "the father of the Indian software product industry". He was given the CSI Honorary Fellowship Award by the Computer Society of India (CSI) in 2014. In 2020, he received the Padma Shri honour from the Government of India for his contribution in the field of trade and industry.

Goenka delivered the 16th Lecture organised by the General K.S. Thimayya Memorial Trust.
