= Dalit Voice =

Magazine published in Bangalore, India

Dalit Voice was a political magazine published in Bangalore, India. The current full title is "Dalit Voice: the voice of the persecuted nationalities denied human rights" and it appears fortnightly in both internet and print formats. It was founded in 1981 by V.T. Rajshekar, a former journalist for the Indian Express, who was also its editor. It was the largest circulated Dalit journal in India.

The magazine and its website closed in 2011.

== Positions ==
The magazine is described by the Columbia University library as

"characterized by strong anti-Brahminist, anti-caste and anti-racist stance, advocacy of liberation from Brahminism, and polemical tone. Self-proclaimed as "the sole spokesman for the entire deprived, dehumanised lot of India...", – Dalits, Backward Castes, Christians, Muslims, Sikhs, women – "all victims of the Aryan Brahminical racism."

The magazine published articles that attacked Hinduism, Zionism, Judaism, Communism and American neoconservatism.

Its anti-Brahmin rhetoric frequently follows to further antisemitism with claims of Brahmins in India being related to Jews and deriving their "fanaticism" and "arrogance" from "Jewish Zionist Racism", the magazine calls Brahmins "the Jews of India" and says that Jews and Brahmins are both races and Brahmins are blood brothers of Jews though on many occasions it contradicts itself, calling Brahmins as Aryans and saying that they elevated Krishna to godhood and built the sex-filled story of Mahabharat round him, to co-opt the rebellious Yadavas. V.T. Rajshekar was arrested under the Sedition Act under the Indian Penal Code for creating disaffection between communities. He was released only after a written apology.

Dalit Voice also made various Brahmin-Zionist conspiracy claims and touted 'Zionist conspiracy theories'. The magazine claimed that Lenin and all communist leaders were Jews and communism was a Jewish conspiracy to destroy Christianity and establish Zionist Israel. The editor V.T. Rajsekhar has treated the hoax text The Protocols of the Elders of Zion as legitimate and has accused Brahmins and Zionists of a conspiracy to "join hands (with Hindus who he says are only upper castes) to crush Muslims, Blacks and India's Dalits."

Dalit Voice, in addition to publishing articles about "Zionist conspiracies" regarding Hitler and the Third Reich, have also supported the Iranian government and Mahmoud Ahmadinejad's denial of the holocaust.

It also claimed that the September 11, 2001 attacks in USA were covertly executed by Zionists controlling America and used to attack and destroy Muslim nations.

He has also published articles in Dalit Voice that call for shifting the Jewish state of Israel to the United States.

Dalit Voice expressed praise for Barack Obama and praised suicide bombing, calling it the art of dying and the supreme sacrifice and claims to be the first in the world to predict defeat of U.S in the war on terror.

== Reception ==
A scholar, Vijay Prashad, has written of the links between a group of authors including V.T. Rajshekar, Ivan van Sertima and Runoko Rashidi and writers in the Afrocentric movement. He called this a "submerged network of Afro-Dalit literature". He mentioned Rajshekar's editorship of Dalit Voice, saying that its pages had "welcomed African American scholars for at least a decade". He criticized the views of this group of writers as "epidermal determinism" (seeking solidarity on the basis of skin colour alone rather than on the experience of oppression).

The writer Koenraad Elst has criticised the publication for having anti-Hindu views.

Leon Poliakov writes that the antisemitism exhibited by Dalit Voice is a fairly recent and unrepresentative phenomenon among India's Dalits.

Dalit Voice has also been criticized for "buying into anti-Jewish conspiracy theories" by the far-left 'Maoist International Movement' though they praised the Dalit Voice for having "some good information on caste and other problems in India".
