= V. T. Rajshekar =

Indian journalist and human rights activist (1932–2024)

Vontibettu Thimmappa Rajshekar Shetty (c. 1932 – 20 November 2024) was an Indian journalist. He was the founder and editor of the Dalit Voice, which has been described by Human Rights Watch as "India's most widely circulated Dalit journal".

Rajshekar was a journalist for the Indian Express, where he worked for 25 years. He founded 'Dalit Voice' organisation, a radical wing of the broader movement for Dalit interests.

== Positions and Dalit Voice ==
Started in 1981, Dalit Voice is a periodical launched by Rajshekhar. Under Rajshekhar's the Dalit Voice organisation formulated an Indian variant of afrocentrism similar to that of the Nation of Islam in the USA but it is different from other magazines in many aspects. It is notable for promoting radical antisemitism borrowed from Western sources and also its link to Afrocentrist ideologies. The book declares the Indian castes as nations within the nation of India. It argues for the strengthening of each caste.

== Controversy and criticism ==
Dalit Voice harshly criticizes Israel and Zionism, which at times crosses the line into antisemitism. It has published articles about 'Zionist conspiracies' regarding Hitler and the Third Reich. They have also supported the Iranian government and Mahmoud Ahmadinejad's denial of the Holocaust.

== Arrests ==
In 1986 Rajshekar's passport was confiscated because of "anti-Hinduism writings outside of India". The same year, he was arrested in Bangalore under India's Terrorism and Anti-Disruptive Activities Act. Rajshekar told Human Rights Watch that this arrest was for an editorial he had written in Dalit Voice, that another writer who republished the editorial was also arrested, and that he was eventually released with an apology. Rajshekar had also been arrested under the Sedition Act and under the Indian Penal Code for creating disaffection between communities.

== Death ==
Rajshekar died on 20 November 2024, at the age of 92.

== Works ==
- Dalit Movement in Karnataka
- How Marx failed In Hindu India
- Why Godse Killed Gandhi
- Hindu Serpent And Muslim Mongoose
- Dialogue Of The Bhoodevatas
- Bhoodevtavon Ki Batchit in Urdu
- Mahatma Gandhi and Babasaheb Ambedkar: Clash of Two Values: The Verdict of History. Bangalore: Dalit Sahitya Akademy, 1989
- Dalit: The Black Untouchables of India (foreword by Y.N. Kly). Atlanta; Ottawa: Clarity Press, c1987 (Originally published under title: Apartheid in India. Bangalore: Dalit Action Committee, 1979)
- Apartheid in India: An International Problem, 2nd rev. ed. Publisher: Bangalore: Dalit Sahitya Akademy, 1983
- Ambedkar and His Conversion: a critique. Bangalore: Dalit Action Committee, Karnataka, 1980
- Judicial Terrorism
- India As A Failed State
- Aggression On Indian Culture
- Development Redefined
- Caste – A Nation within the Nation
- India's Intellectual Desert
- The Zionist Arthashastra (Protocols of the Learned Elders of Zion)
- Brahminism In India And Zionism In West
- India's Muslim Problem
- India On The Path To Islamisation
- Dalit Voice – A New Experiment in Journalism
- Brahminism
- Weopons To Fight Counter Revolution
- Riddles in Hinduism by Babasaheb Ambedkar
- Know The Hindu Mind

== Awards ==
- (2005) "Book of the Year Award" by London Institute of South Asia (LISA).
- (2018) "Mukundan C Menon Award" by the National Confederation of Human Rights Organization (NCHRO).
