= Tally Solutions =

Indian multinational technology company

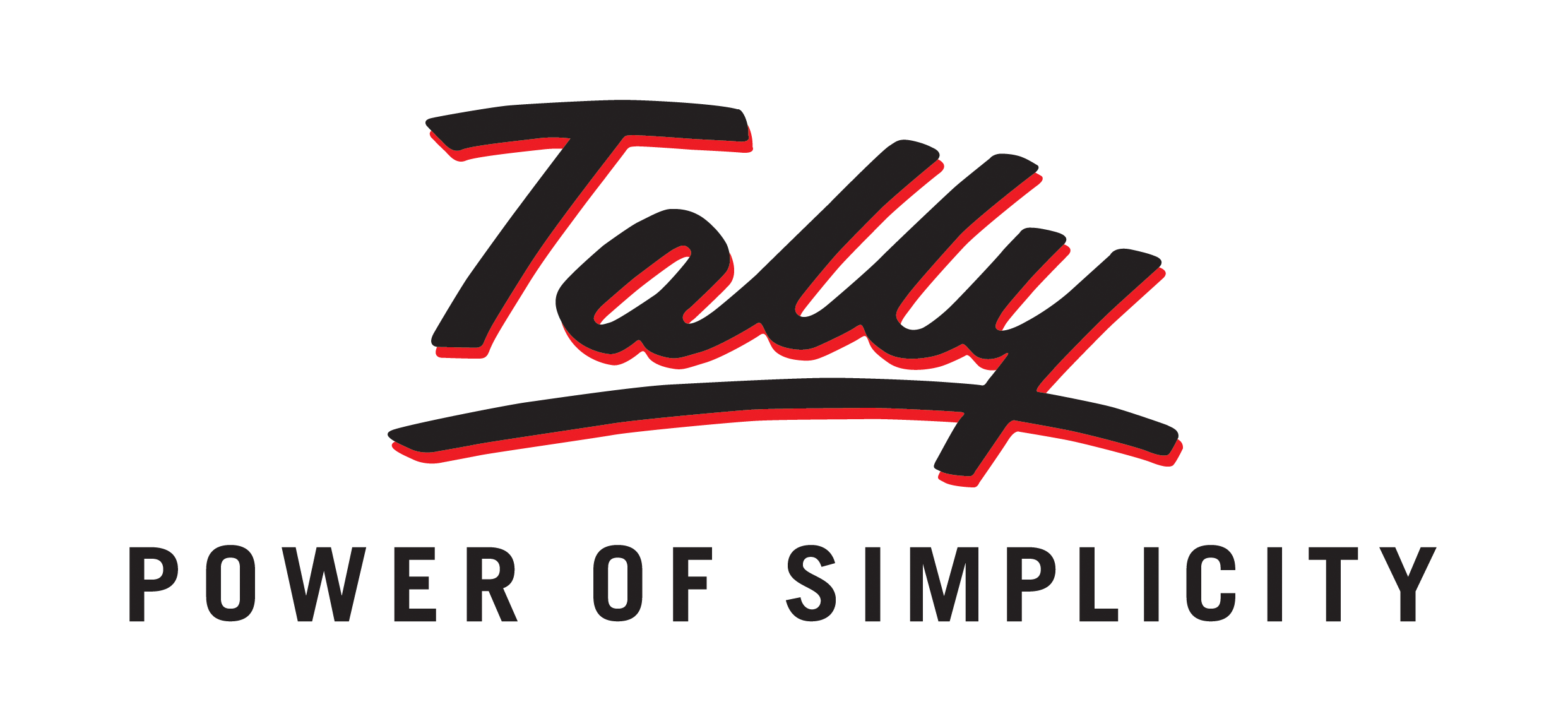
- Trade name: Tally
- Type: Private
- Industry: Accounting software; Inventory software; ERP software
- Founded: 1986; 40 years ago as Peutronics Financial Accountant
- Founders: Shyam Sunder Goenka; Bharat Goenka
- Headquarters: Bangalore, Karnataka, India
- Area served: Worldwide
- Key people: Tejas Goenka (Managing Director); Sheela Goenka (Chairperson); Nupur Goenka (Executive Director); Amrish Kumar Jain (CIO)
- Products: TallyPrime; TSS (Tally Software Service); Tally.ERP 9 Tally.Server 9 Tally.Developer 9 Shoper 9
- Revenue: ▲₹578 crore (US$60 million) (FY23)
- Website: tallysolutions.com

Tally Solutions is an Indian multinational technology company that provides enterprise resource planning software. It is headquartered in Bangalore.

== History ==
Tally Solutions was co-founded in 1986 by Shyam Sunder Goenka and his son Bharat Goenka after the family's cotton business was destroyed by fire. It began as Peutronics Financial Accountant, an accounting software application. The company was incorporated on November 8, 1991, and was renamed Tally Solutions in 1999.

Shyam Sundar Goenka was running a company that supplied raw materials and machine parts to plants and textile mills in southern and eastern India. Unable to find software that could manage his books of accounts, he asked his son, Bharat Goenka, 23, a Maths graduate to create a software application that would handle financial accounts for his business. The first version of the accounting software was launched as an MS-DOS application. It had only basic accounting functions, and was named Peutronics Financial Accountant.

In 2006, Tally launched Tally 8.1, a concurrent multi-lingual version, and also Tally 9. In 2009, the company released Tally. ERP 9, a business management solution

In 2015, the company launched a program called Vriddhi to certify and classify its business partners. Also in 2015, Tally Solutions announced the launch of Tally. ERP 9 Release 5.0 with taxation and compliance features. In 2016, Tally Solutions was shortlisted as a GST Suvidha Provider to provide interface between the new Goods and Services Tax (GST) server and taxpayers, and in 2017, the company launched its updated GST compliance software.

In 2020, the company released TallyPrime. In 2022, they introduced TallyPrime Edit Log.

== Products and services ==
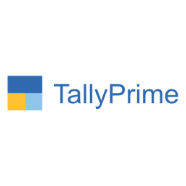
TallyPrime logo

Tally Solutions sells enterprise resource software and business management software to SMEs (small and medium-sized business enterprises). The company's flagship product, Tally.ERP 9, was replaced by TallyPrime in 2020. In 2022, they worked with more than 28,000 partners. Tally Solutions has collaborated with Amazon Web Services to make TallyPrime available on the AWS. It was launched in December 2021. Products also include Shoper 9, which is a retail management software.
