= Shyam Sundar (academic) =

Indian academic

Shyam Sundar is an Indian academic and professor at Banaras Hindu University. He works on infectious diseases – Leishmaniasis and HIV/AIDS.

== Publications ==
- Visceral leishmaniasis: what are the needs for diagnosis, treatment and control?
- Failure of Pentavalent Antimony in Visceral Leishmaniasis in India: Report from the Center of the Indian Epidemic
- Rapid accurate field diagnosis of Indian visceral leishmaniasis
- Splenic accumulation of IL-10 mRNA in T cells distinct from CD4^{+}CD25^{+} (Foxp3) regulatory T cells in human visceral leishmaniasis
- Trial of oral miltefosine for visceral leishmaniasis
- Determinants of survival in adult HIV patients on antiretroviral therapy in Eastern Uttar Pradesh: A prospective study
