= Shyam Sundar Hembram =

Santhali writer

- Born: Odisha, India
- Occupation: Writer
- Writing career
- Subject: Santhali Writings

Shyam Sundar Hembram was a Santhali writer and educator. Chattarpati Kisku Rapaj is one of his notable plays, published in 1948. In 1950, he published Kherwal Akil Bati (Collection of songs). In 1990, he was honored by the All India Santali Writers Association for his contribution to the Santali language and literature.
