= Shyam Sunder Goenka =

Indian businessperson (1932–2002)

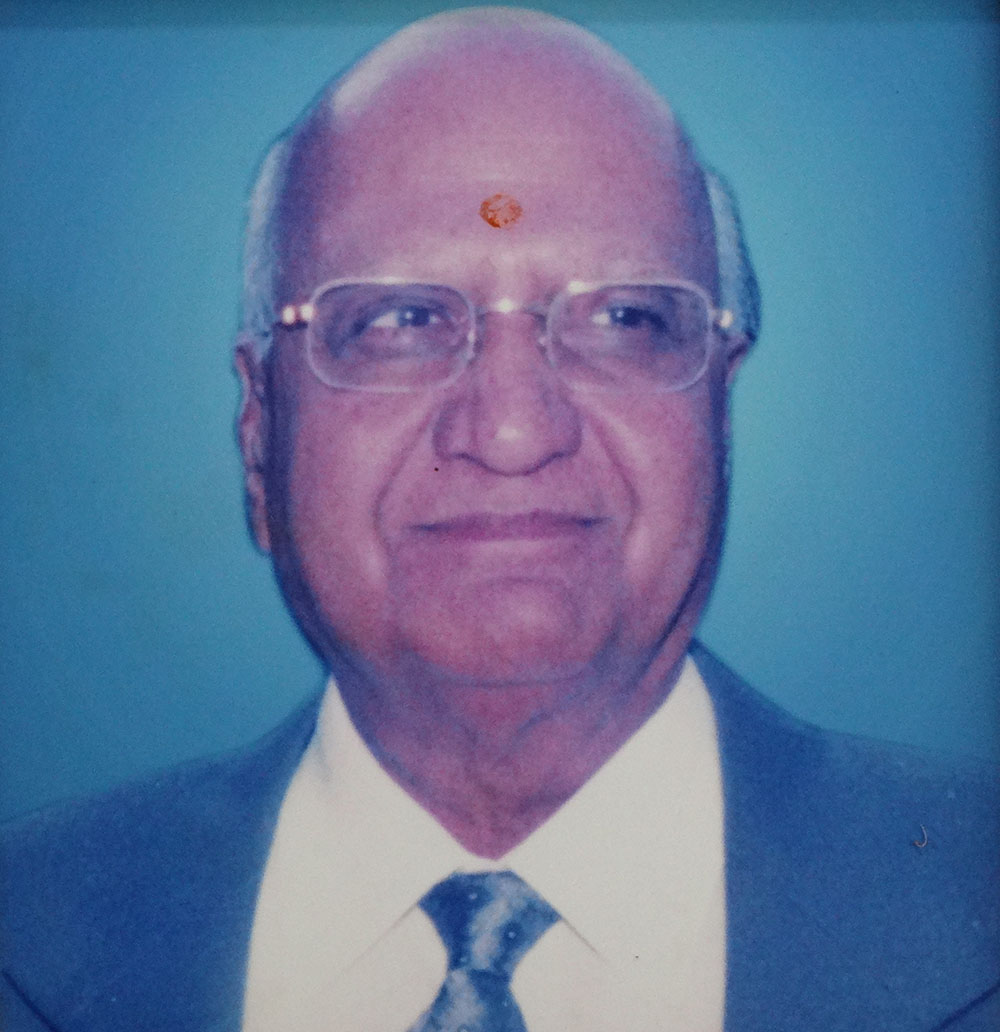
- Born: 15 October 1932 (age 93); Calcutta, Bengal Presidency, British India (present day West Bengal, India)
- Died: 21 October 2002 (aged 70); Bangalore, Karnataka, India
- Occupation: Entrepreneur
- Children: Bharat Goenka

Shyam Sunder Goenka (15 October 1932 – 21 October 2002) was an Indian entrepreneur, who founded Bangalore-based Tally Solutions, one of India's first software product companies.

== Early life and background ==
He was born on 15 October 1932 in Kolkata in a Marwari family to parents Thakursi Das Goenka and Bhagwani Devi Goenka.

Shyam Sunder Goenka graduated in commerce from West Bengal State University. During the late 1960s, he moved out of Calcutta, to set up his own textile machinery business called Vijay Bobbins and Industries Pvt. Ltd. in Bangalore.

== Career ==
In the 1980s, while running the textile machinery business, Shyam Sunder Goenka was looking for software to manage his business but was unable to find one which was simple and efficient. This prompted him to inspire his son, Bharat Goenka, to pursue his passion for software and technology to create software that would handle financial accounts for his business. His guidance led to the creation of an accounting software called Peutronics Financial Accountant (PFA).

He took the first version to the market to sell to hitherto unknown buyers, before taking advantage of his social network and business associates for adoption. The positive response that the software received in an age where buying computers was still an expensive affair for companies in India, led S. S. Goenka to believe in the product's potential and market reach.

In 1986, he along with his son established Peutronics as a company which later morphed into Tally Solutions Pvt. Ltd. in 1999 and the software, PFA became popular as Tally.

Headquartered in Bangalore, India, S. S. Goenka expanded the company to three metro cities in India – Mumbai, Delhi and Kolkata, along with an international office at London.

S. S. Goenka led the product to early popularity of more than lakh customers thanks to its channel partner network in India.

He died of a heart attack on 21 October 2002 in Bangalore at the age of 70.
