= Shyam Sundar Goswami =

Indian Classical vocalist

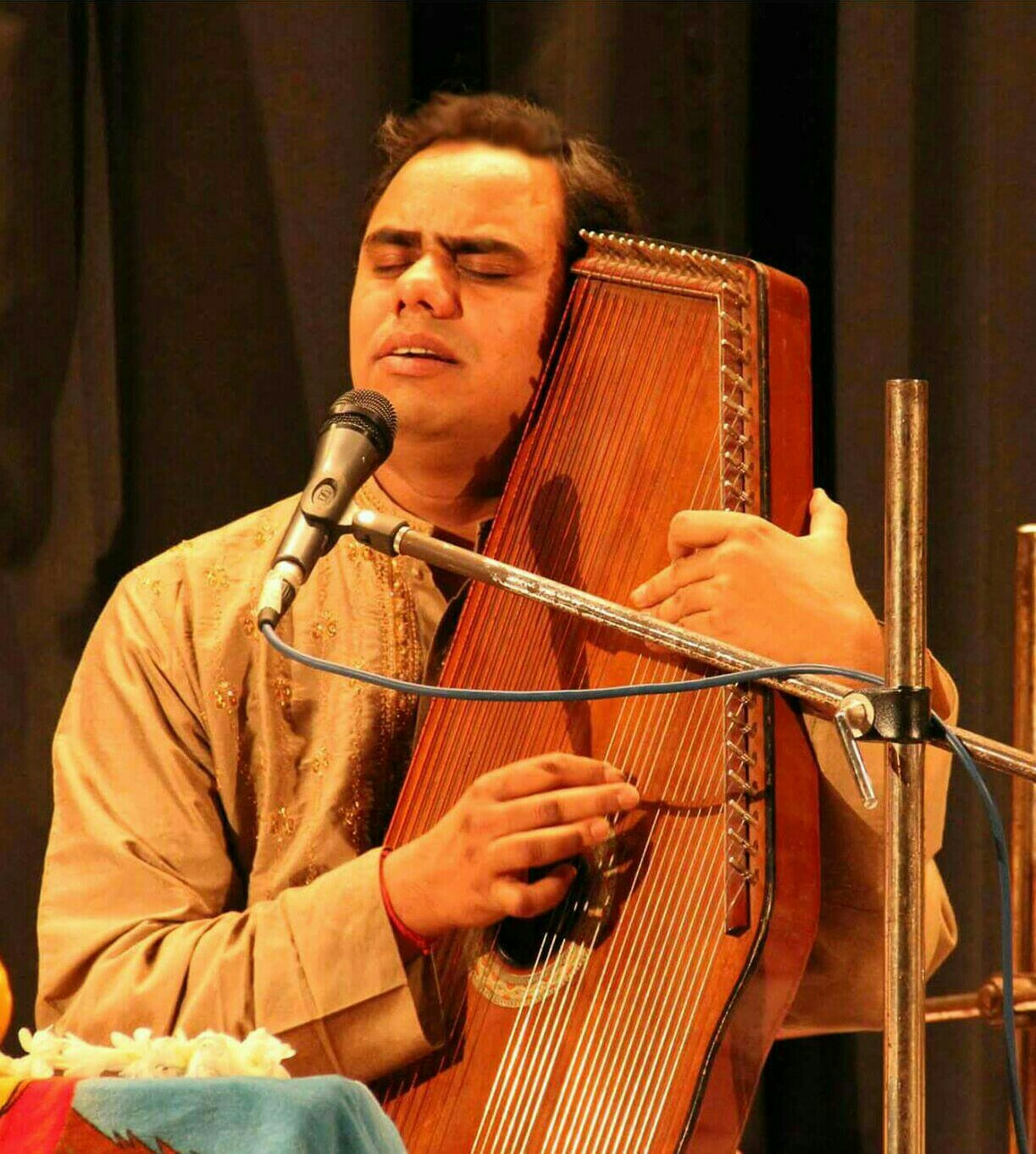
- Shyam Sundar Goswami

Background information
- Birth name: Shyam Sundar Goswami
- Genres: Hindustani classical music
- Occupation: Vocalist
- Years active: 2000 – present
- Website: Shyam Sundar Goswami: Google Sites

Shyam Sundar Goswami (Bengali: শ্যাম সুন্দর গোস্বামী) is an Indian classical vocalist, trained in Kirana Gharana.

== Early life ==
Goswami's father was Pravupada Dwijendranath Goswami, a spiritual teacher (guru) and Sanskrit scholar. Shyam received his first musical training from his mother, Maya Goswami, after which he was trained by Jadunath Chakraborty and Madan Mohan Thakur. He studied Indian classical music at Rabindra Bharati University, graduating with an Honours degree. He studied his M.A. in khyal at the same university.

== Career ==
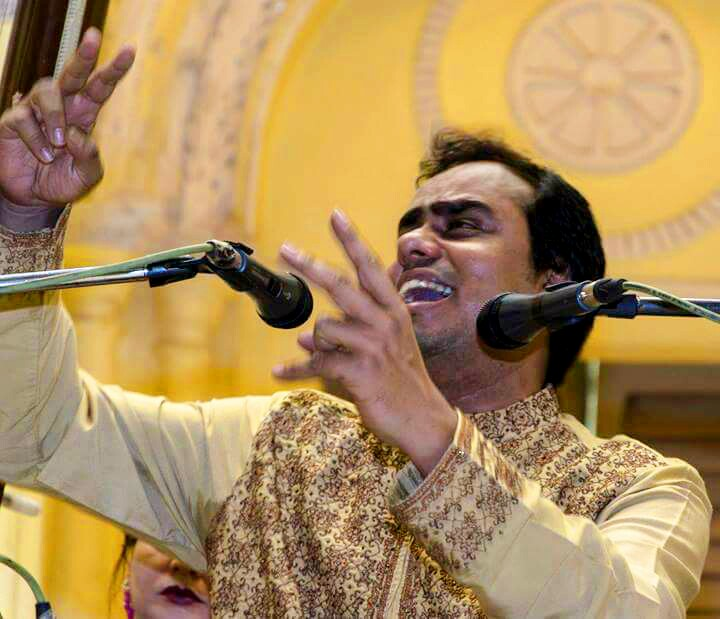
Goswami performing at Sovabazar Rajbari in 2014

Goswami's repertoire includes khayals, thumris and bhajans, as well as medieval songs (prabandh sangeet, kirtans). He has mastered the songs of "Geet Govind", a work of poetry and songs by Jayadeva.

In recognition of his musical research, he was awarded a scholarship from the French Government, and worked at La Cite Internationale Das Arts in Paris.

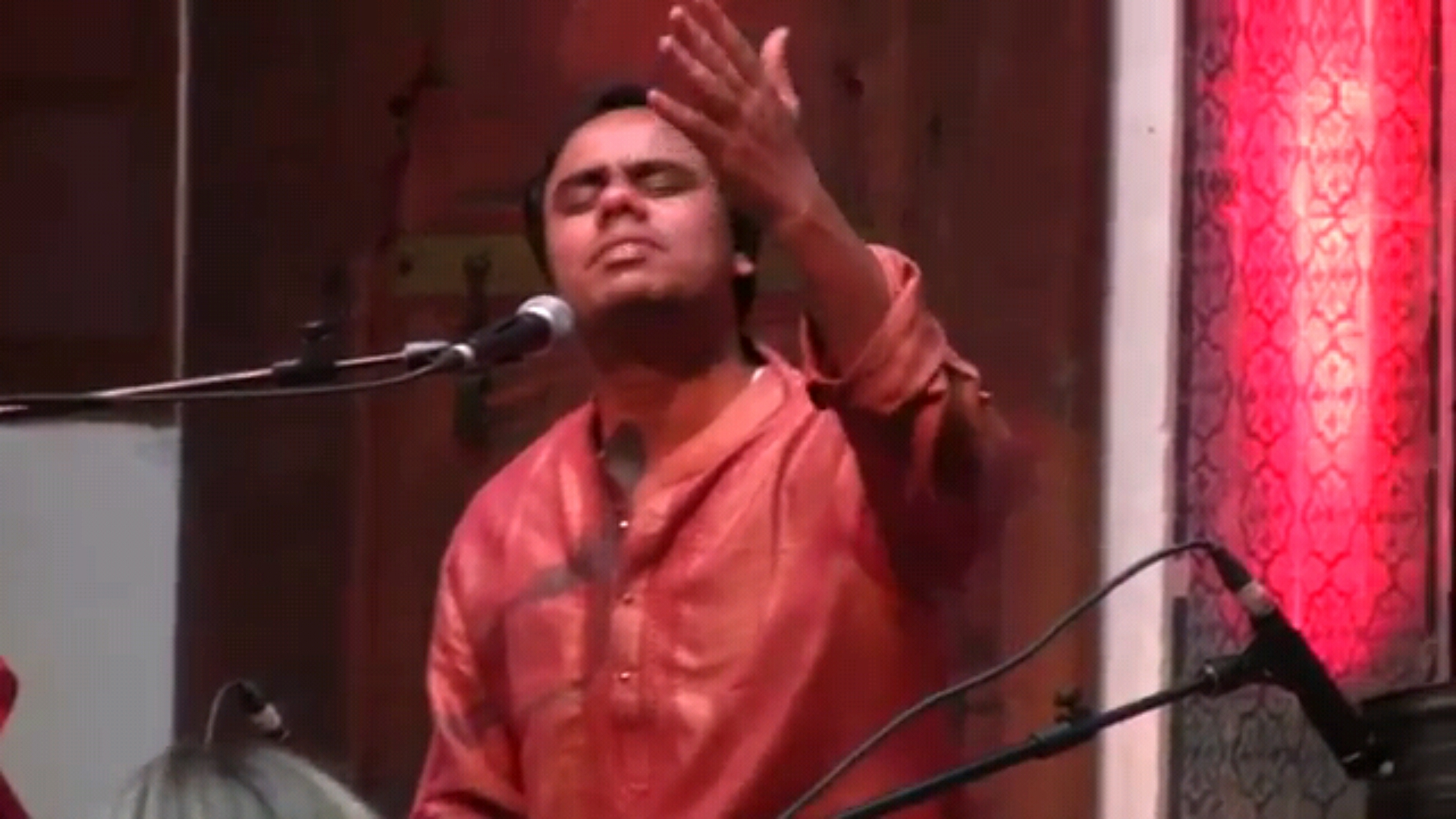
Goswami performing at the Fes Festival in 2013

Goswami has performed in India and in Europe, Morocco, and South Africa. His first CD album, Peace and Harmony, was released on 24 April 2006. In February 2017, Goswami performed Hindustani classical music at the "Sacrées Journeés de Strasbourg" festival in France, where an international program of musicians presented traditional music indigenous to their countries.

Goswami has conducted workshops in various educational institutions in India and abroad, including Le College des Cordeliers Dinan (France), Rabindra Maitree University, Islamic University (Bangladesh), and Rabindra Bharati University (Kolkata, India).

== Awards ==
In 2018, Goswami was awarded the Association Drapeau de la Paix in Marseille, France, and the Kabi Krishnadas Kabiraj Samman.
