= Shyam Sunder Kapoor =

Indian physicist

- Born: 14 June 1938 (age 88); India
- Education: Agra University; University of Bombay; Lawrence Berkeley National Laboratory; University of California, Berkeley
- Known for: Studies on nuclear fission and heavy-ion physics
- Awards: 1983 Shanti Swarup Bhatnagar Prize; 1996 Goyal Prize; 2006 R. D. Birla Award
- Scientific career
- Fields: Nuclear physics; Particle physics
- Workplaces: Bhabha Atomic Research Centre; Tata Institute of Fundamental Research; Heidelberg University; Indian National Science Academy
- Doctoral advisor: Raja Ramanna

Shyam Sunder Kapoor (born 14 June 1938) is an Indian nuclear physicist and a former director of Bhabha Atomic Research Centre. Known for his research on fission and heavy-ion physics, Kapoor is an elected fellow of all the three major Indian science academies – Indian Academy of Sciences, Indian National Science Academy and National Academy of Sciences, India – as well as the Institute of Physics. The Council of Scientific and Industrial Research, the apex agency of the Government of India for scientific research, awarded him the Shanti Swarup Bhatnagar Prize for Science and Technology, one of the highest Indian science awards, for his contributions to Physical Sciences in 1983. (Note: Long link – please select award year to see details)

== Biography ==
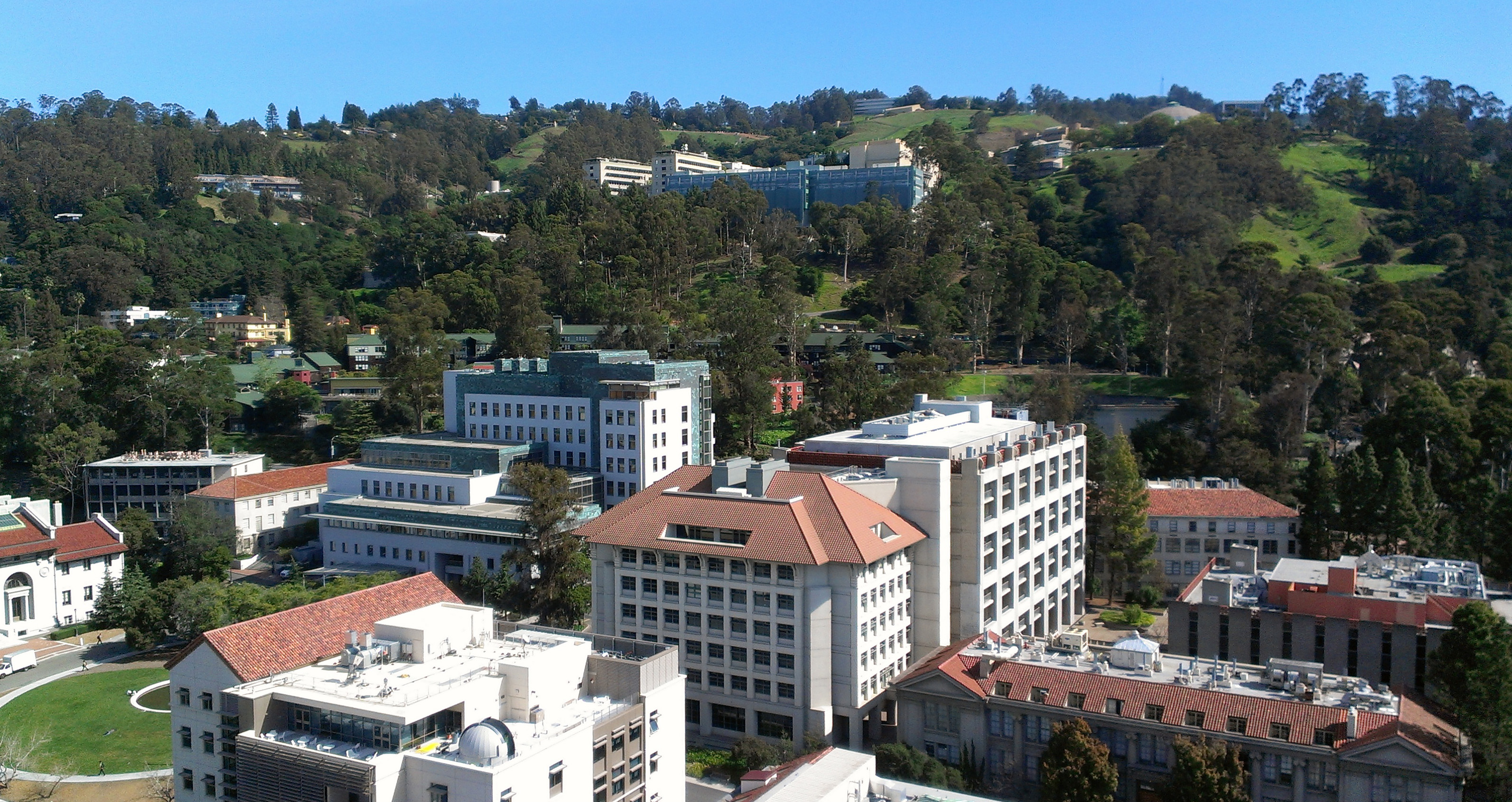
UC-Berkeley – Lawrence Berkeley National Laboratory

S. S. Kapoor, born on 14 June 1938, earned an MSc from Agra University in physics in 1958 before starting his career in 1959 at Bhabha Atomic Research Centre (then known as Atomic Energy Establishment). While on service, he pursued his doctoral studies mentored by Raja Ramanna, who would later spearhead India's first successful nuclear program, Smiling Buddha, in 1974. After securing a PhD in 1963, he took a sabbatical from work and did his post-doctoral studies in nuclear fission at Lawrence Berkeley National Laboratory of the University of California, Berkeley from 1964 where he worked at the cyclotron accelerator and returned to BARC in 1966 to resume his service. He became the director in charge of Physics Group as well as Electronics and Instrumentation Group in 1990 and served out his regular service at BARC, holding the position until his superannuation in 2000. He also served as the head of the nuclear physics division and as the project director of Pelletron Accelerator facility, a BARC centre located in Tata Institute of Fundamental Research campus. In between, he had a short stint abroad as a visiting scientist at Physikalische Institute of the University of Heidelberg during 1980–81. Post-retirement, he continued his association with BARC, holding the DAE-Homi Bhabha chair from 2000 to 2005. Subsequently, he took up the position of a senior scientist with Indian National Science Academy and in June 2008, he was made an honorary scientist by the academy.

Kapoor lives with his family in Deonar, a suburban town of Mumbai, in Maharashtra. He has a son and a daughter.

== Legacy ==
A schematic nuclear fission chain reaction

Kapoor's work has been mainly in the fields of nuclear fission. He studied heavy-ion fusion-fission dynamics, nuclear shell models and radiation detectors as well as particle accelerators and was associated with several accelerators including cyclotron facility at Lawrence Berkeley National Laboratory, Universal Linear Accelerator, Darmstadt, BARC heavy-ion accelerator at Tata Institute of Fundamental Research and Tandem-Linac accelerator at Legnaro National Laboratories (INFN), during various periods of time. His research assisted in widening the understanding of light-charged particles and large scale nuclear motion and his contributions are reported in the development of a new faster process for nuclear splitting. His studies have been documented by way of a number of articles (Note: Please see Selected bibliography section) and the article repository of Indian Academy of Sciences has listed 137 of them. Besides, he has published a book, Nuclear Radiation Detectors, which is now a prescribed text for academic studies in many institutions such as Maharaja Sayajirao University of Baroda, Maharshi Dayanand University, Savitribai Phule Pune University and Deenbandhu Chhotu Ram University of Science and Technology. He has also contributed chapters to books published by others and his work has drawn citations from other scientists.

Kapoor was the head of the Indian scientific delegation from BARC at PHENIX collaboration of Brookhaven National Laboratory, which was the largest experiment which collected data at Relativistic Heavy Ion Collider (RHIC). He led the team which established the BARC pelletron accelerator facility at TIFR in 1989 and the facility has since evolved into a prominent Indian base of heavy-ion research. He was the coordinator of the committee which oversaw the development of Accelerator-driven reactor systems in India. He was a member of the International Nuclear Data Committee (INDC) of the International Atomic Energy Agency (IAEA) from 1985 to 2000 and chaired the committee during 1994–97. He is a founder member of the Asian Committee for Future Accelerator (ACFA) and was involved in the evolution of the committee during its formative years. He has been a member of the cost-review team of International Linear Collider and sat in the phase II technical committee of Inter-University Accelerator Centre (IUAC) in 2004. He presided the Indian Physics Association during 1997–99 and the physics section of the 81st Indian Science Congress held at Jaipur in 1994 and is a life member of the Indian Society for Radiation Physics. A former member of the council of the Indian National Science Academy (1996–98), Kapoor has delivered several keynote or invited speeches which included the Founder's Day Address at Bhabha Atomic Research Centre and DAE- Raja Ramanna Lecture in Physics on Frontiers in nuclear fission, superheavy nuclei and nuclear energy at Jawaharlal Nehru Centre for Advanced Scientific Research, both in 2003.

== Awards and honors ==
Kapoor was elected by the Indian Academy of Sciences as their fellow in 1974. The Council of Scientific and Industrial Research awarded him the Shanti Swarup Bhatnagar Prize, one of the highest Indian science awards in 1983. He became an elected fellow of the remaining two major Indian science academies a decade apart, with Indian National Science Academy fellowship reaching him in 1984 followed by the fellowship of the National Academy of Sciences, India in 1994. He received the Goyal Prize of Kurukshetra University in 1996 and R. D. Birla Award in 2006. He is also a fellow of the Institute of Physics.

== Selected bibliography ==
=== Books ===
- S.S. Kapoor; V. S. Ramamurthy (April 1986). Nuclear Radiation Detectors. New Age International. pp. 238–. ISBN 978-0-85226-496-6.

=== Chapters ===
- Asoke Nath Mitra (2009). India in the World of Physics: Then and Now. Pearson Education India. pp. 303–. ISBN 978-81-317-1579-6.

=== Articles ===
- S. S. Kapoor, H. R. Bowman, S. G. Thompson (1965). "Emission of K X Rays and Division of Nuclear Charge in the Spontaneous Fission of ^{252}Cf". Physical Review. 140 (5B): 1310. Bibcode:1965PhRv..140.1310K. doi:10.1103/PhysRev.140.B1310. S2CID 120687410.
- S. S. Kapoor, S. K. Kataria, S. R. S. Murthy, D. M. Nadkarni, V. S. Ramamurthy, P. N. Rama Rao (1971). "Studies of the Times of Emission and Multiplicities of K X Rays from Fission Fragments of Specified Atomic Numbers". Physical Review C. 4 (6): 2165–2175. Bibcode:1971PhRvC...4.2165K. doi:10.1103/PhysRevC.4.2165.
- S. S. Kapoor, J. N. De (1982). "Energy loss, nucleon exchange, and neutron-proton correlation in heavy-ion reactions". Physical Review C. 26 (1): 172–177. Bibcode:1982PhRvC..26..172K. doi:10.1103/PhysRevC.26.172.
- V. S. Ramamurthy, S. S. Kapoor, R. K. Choudhury, A. Saxena, D. M. Nadkarni, A. K. Mohanty, B. K. Nayak, S. V. Sastry, S. Kailas, A. Chatterjee, P. Singh, A. Navin (1990). "Entrance-channel dependence of fission-fragment anisotropies: A direct experimental signature of fission before equilibration". Physical Review Letters. 65 (1–2): 25–28. Bibcode:1990PhRvL..65...25R. doi:10.1103/PhysRevLett.65.25. PMID 10042163.
- A. Chatterjee, A. Navin, S. Kailas, P. Singh, D. C. Biswas, A. Karnik, S. S. Kapoor (1995). "Precision charged particle emission in ^{19}F+^{232}Th". Physical Review C. 52 (6): 3167–3173. Bibcode:1995PhRvC..52.3167C. doi:10.1103/PhysRevC.52.3167. PMID 9970862.
- R. Vandenbosch, J. D. Bierman, J. P. Lestone, J. F. Liang, D. J. Prindle, A. A. Sonzogni, S. Kailas, D. M. Nadkarni, S. S. Kapoor (1996). "Disappearance of entrance channel dependence of fission fragment anisotropies at well-above-barrier energies". Physical Review C. 54 (3): R977–R980. Bibcode:1996PhRvC..54..977V. doi:10.1103/PhysRevC.54.R977. PMID 9971495.
- S. S. Kapoor (2015). "Seventy-five years of nuclear fission". Pramana. 85 (2): 191–198. Bibcode:2015Prama..85..191K. doi:10.1007/s12043-015-1025-5. S2CID 116998116.

== See also ==
- Nuclear radiation
- Pelletron
- Particle accelerator
- Nuclear power plant
