= Shyam Sunder (economist) =

American accounting theorist and experimental economist

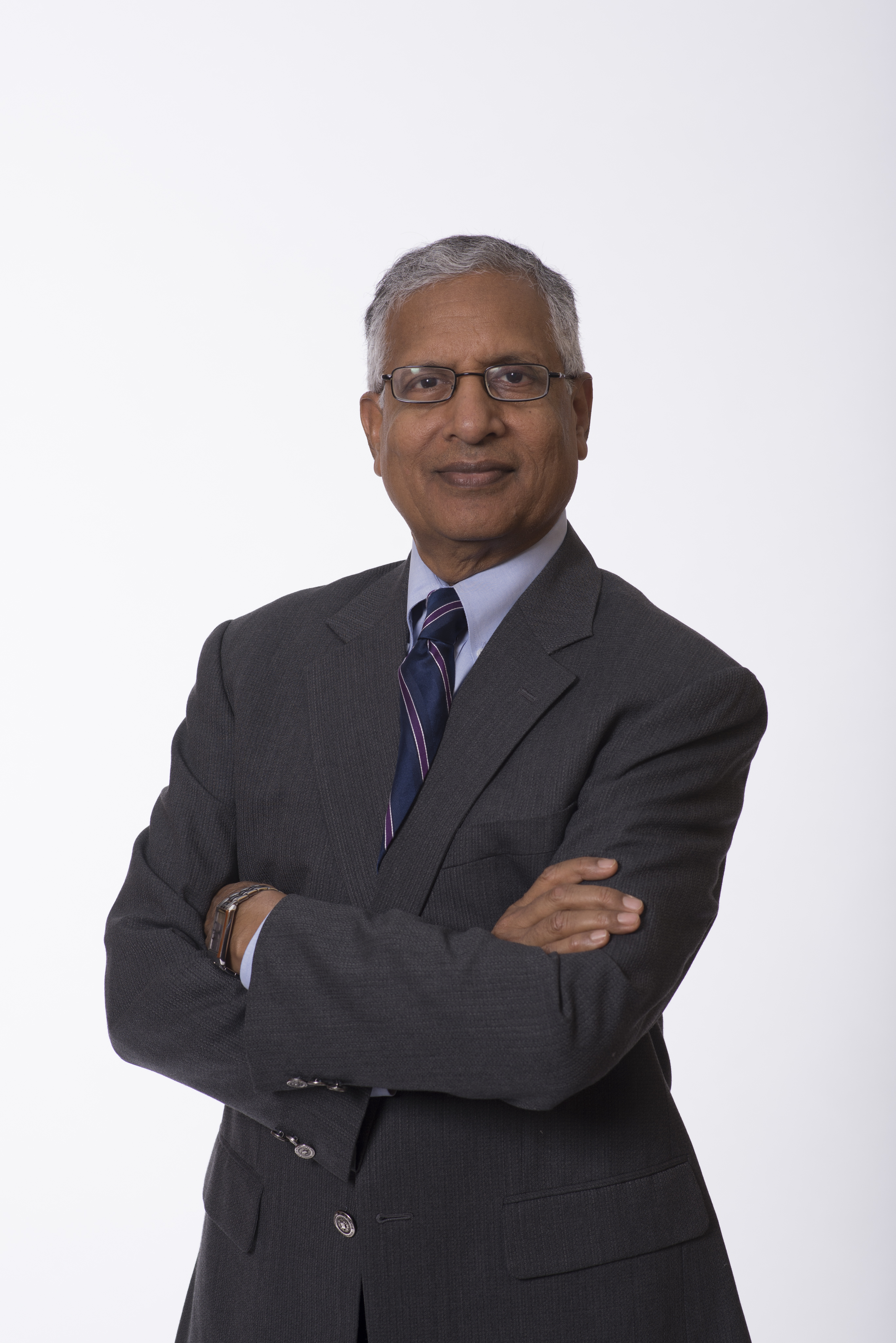
- Born: July 10, 1944 (age 82)

Academic background
- Education: IIT Kharagpur (transferred out); Indian Railway Institute of Mechanical & Electrical Engineering; Carnegie Mellon University
- Doctoral advisor: Yuji Ijiri, Robert S. Kaplan, Edward C. Prescott & Richard Roll

Academic work
- Discipline: Accounting Theory and Experimental Economics
- Institutions: Yale School of Management
- Notable ideas: Standards and Norms of Financial Reporting; Information in Security Markets; Market Properties with Zero Intelligence Traders; Simpson's Paradox in Cost Accounting
- Awards: American Accounting Association’s Outstanding Accounting Educator (2013); American Accounting Association's Manuscript Award (1975); The Accounting Hall of Fame (2020)
- Website: faculty.som.yale.edu/shyamsunder

Shyam Sunder (born July 10, 1944) is an accounting theorist and experimental economist. He is the James L. Frank Professor of accounting, economics, and finance at the Yale School of Management; a professor in Yale University’s Department of Economics; and a Fellow of the Whitney Humanities Center.

== Biography ==
Sunder is a pioneer in the fields of experimental finance and experimental macroeconomics. Over the course of his career, he has conducted research on financial reporting, information dissemination in security markets, statistical theory of valuation, and the design of electronic markets. His current research explores how to structure accounting and auditing institutions to obtain an efficient balance between regulatory oversight and market competition.

Before moving to the United States, Sunder was educated at IIT Kharagpur, Indian Railways School of Mechanical & Electrical Engineering at Jamalpur. Subsequently he received his PhD from Carnegie Mellon University in 1974. Before coming to Yale University, he served on the faculties of the University of Chicago, IIM Ahmedabad, the California Institute of Technology, the University of Minnesota, and Carnegie Mellon University.

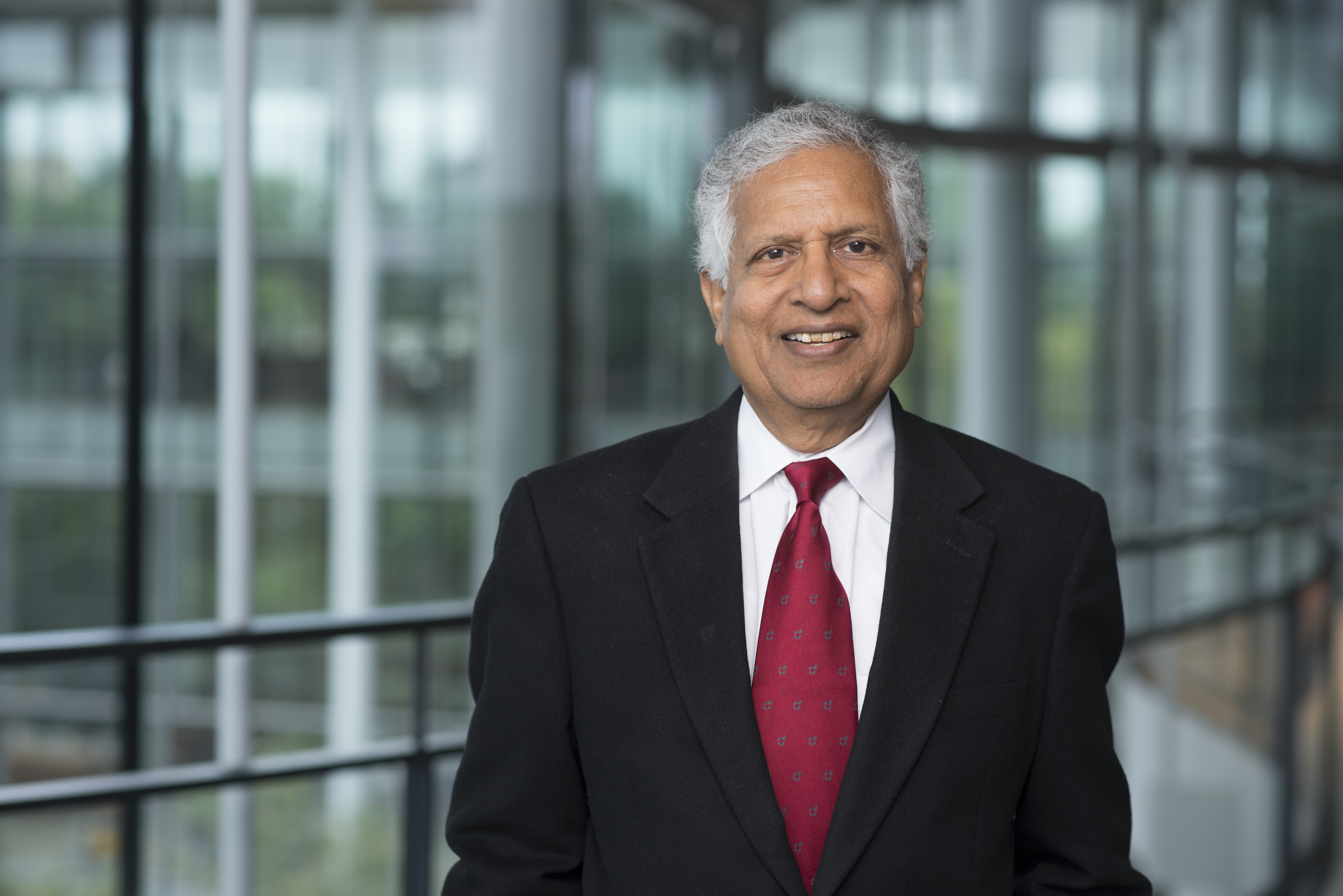
Shyam Sunder in Evans Hall, Yale University

== Publications ==
Sunder has published six books, including Theory of Accounting and Control, and over 200 articles in academic journals and popular media. His research has appeared in noteworthy economics, accounting, and finance journals including Econometrica, the Journal of Political Economy, the Journal of Accounting and Economics, The Accounting Review, and The Journal of Finance.

Articles in major academic journals include:

- “Allocative efficiency of markets with zero-intelligence traders: Market as a partial substitute for individual rationality”, with D.K. Gode, Journal of Political Economy, 1993
- “Efficiency of experimental security markets with insider information: An application of rational-expectations models”, with C. R. Plott, Journal of Political Economy, 1982.
- “Rational expectations and the aggregation of diverse information in laboratory security markets” with C. R. Plott, Econometrica, 1988.
- “Market for Information: Experimental Evidence”, Econometrica, 1992.

== Honors and awards ==
Sunder has served in numerous leadership roles at noteworthy academic organizations. From 2006 to 2007, he was President of the American Accounting Association. Before that, he was the American Accounting Association's Director of Research from 1988 to 1990. He has also served as Chair of Faculty Organization for the Faculty Senate at Carnegie Mellon University and was a member of the Founding Executive Committee for the Economic Science Association.

Sunder has received many awards for his contributions to accounting research. The American Accounting Association has recognized his research with their Manuscript Award in 1975 and the Outstanding Accounting Educator Award in 2013.

In partnership with the American Institute of Certified Public Accountants, the American Accounting Association also selected him to receive the Notable Contributions to Accounting Literature Award in 1982 and 1998. In 1982, Sunder was selected for the Alpha Kappa Psi Foundation National Accounting Award.

Sunder has been invited to speak at over 300 universities all over the world. He was named a Distinguished Lecturer at the Center for Computational Finance and Economic Agents at the University of Essex in the UK. The American Accounting Association honored him as its Presidential Research Lecturer in 1999 and named him a Distinguished International Visiting Lecturer in 2000.

== Editorships ==
Sunder currently serves on the editorial boards of the Journal of Accounting and Public Policy. and the Indian Accounting Review. He has served on the editorial boards of Experimental Economics, the Computational and Mathematical Organization Theory and was the President of the editorial board of The Accounting Review

== Teaching ==
Sunder has taught generation of students both in Yale College and Yale School of Management. He taught "Econ 488: Experimental Economics" that used "economic experiments to investigate the behavior of economic markets and institutions," and was widely popular with undergraduate students.

== Boards ==
Sunder has served on the boards of the following organizations:

- Academy for Government Accountability, 2006–2008
- American Accounting Association, 2005–2008
- International Association for Accounting, Education, and Research, 2006–2007
- World Computer Exchange, 2000–2009
- GMex, Inc., 1999–2001
- Carnegie Mellon University Board of Trustees, 1997–98
- Financial Executives Institute, Pittsburgh Chapter, 1995–99
- Economic Science Association
