= Shyam Sunder Jyani =

Environmentalist in India

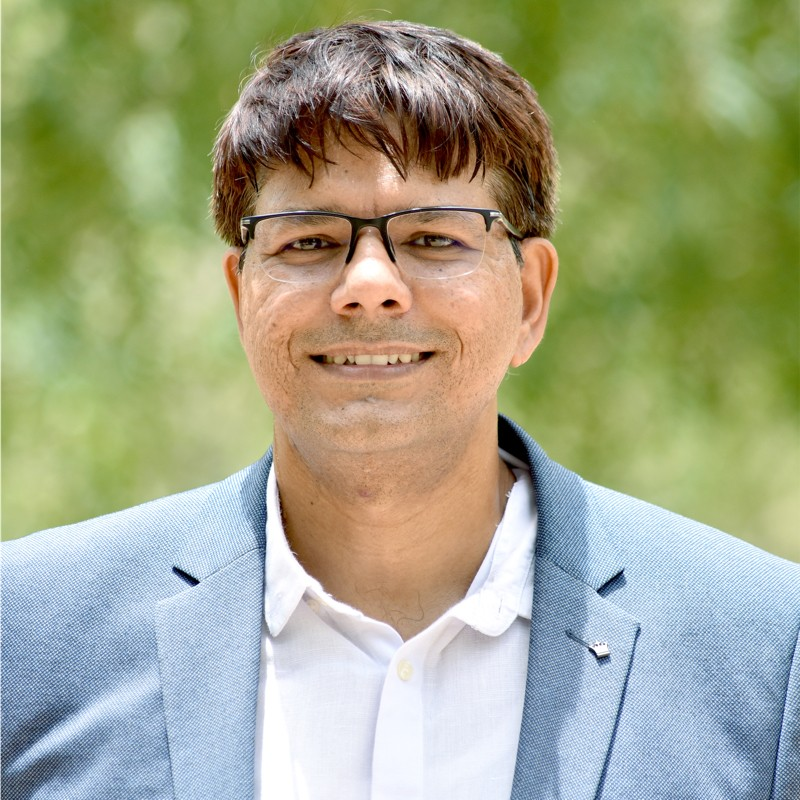
- Born: 1979 (age 46–47); Sri Ganganagar, Rajasthan, India
- Occupations: Associate Professor, Environmentalist
- Known for: Familial Forestry movement
- Awards: UNCCD Land for Life Award (2021)
- Website: familialforestry.org

Shyam Sunder Jyani (born 1979) is an Indian environmentalist and academic, and the founder of the Familial Forestry movement, a grassroots initiative aimed at ecological restoration and combating desertification. He is presently an associate professor of sociology at Government Dungar College, Bikaner and is known for mobilizing millions of people in large-scale afforestation campaigns across Rajasthan.

== Biography ==
Jyani was born into a rural farming family in the village of 12 TK in Sri Ganganagar district, Rajasthan. His environmental work began in 2003, when he and a group of students revived several dying neem trees on the campus of Dungar College, Bikaner. Afterwards he extended the plantation activities to communities.

=== Familial Forestry ===
In 2006, Jyani introduced the concept of Familial Forestry, a model of ecological restoration that encourages families and communities to plant and care for trees as part of their household and community as green members. The initiative began in Himtasar village and later expanded across thousands of villages in Rajasthan. The approach focuses on native and fruit-bearing species, promoting both environmental sustainability and nutritional security. In order to further extend the campaign's reach, he entwined Familial Forestry activities with culture. Key Highlights:

- Over 4 million saplings planted by 2024.
- Participation from more than 2 million families.
- Recognized by UNCCD as a model for sustainable land management. Most of the plants and necessary irrigation tanks were purchased on his own expense. In a 2021 interview with Deutsche Welle, he has also stated plans to expand tree-planting efforts to major cities.

=== Institutional Forests ===
To make campuses nature positive and restore commons through active participation of students and local communities he started developing institutional forest. Began with first instructional forest in his college campus in 2013 till date the number has crossed 200. These instructional forests developed in memorials of Mahatma Gandhi, Jasnath ji, Chaudhary Charan Singh, Shaheed Bhagat Singh and other legendary leaders are thriving forests, growing future generations and regenerating nature.

=== Promotion of millets ===
In 2023, the International Year of Millets, Jyani began to promote the use of millets, especially in traditional rituals such as marriage ceremonies and religious fairs. He also orchestrated an inaugural "Raabri Day" on 23 May 2023, with Raabri being a millet-based drink.

=== Public nurseries ===
Jyani has led plantation of 4 million saplings by engaging over 2 million families from 18,000 villages mainly in Rajasthan and some from other neighbouring states and developed 200 Institutional forests by December 2024.

Under his leadership a network of public nurseries, has been established that provide every year 2,00000 saplings of native species free of cost to the local communities.

=== Dabla Talab restoration ===
In 2022, Jyani led the restoration of Dabla Talab, a 207-acre area of degraded land. Through community-driven habitat healing, the project transformed the barren land into a thriving ecosystem, demonstrating the effectiveness of collective environmental stewardship.

== Awards and honors ==
In recognition of his work, he was awarded the Indira Gandhi National Service Scheme Award in 2012, and later the Land for Life Award from the United Nations Convention to Combat Desertification in 2021.

In recognition of his global impact, Professor Jyani was invited as a special guest to the 15th and 16th Conferences of the Parties (COP-15 and COP-16) of the United Nations Convention to Combat Desertification (UNCCD), where he showcased his expertise in sustainable land management.
