= Madhu Babu =

Telugu Detective Novel Writer

- Born: Valluru Madhusudana Rao; 6 July 1948 (age 78); Thotla Valluru, Krishna district, Andhra Pradesh State
- Occupations: Writer, Novelist, Teacher
- Spouse: Adilakshmi
- Children: Uday (Son)
- Parents: Surya Narayana Rao (father); Bharati (mother)

Madhu Babu (born Valluru Madhusudana Rao) is a prolific and pioneering Indian author in Telugu literature, widely acclaimed for his detective fiction, spy thrillers, and socio-fantasy novels.

== Biography ==
Madhu Babu's iconic fictional detectives and recurring characters—most notably Shadow, alongside Gangaram, Kulakarni, Mukesh, Bindu, and Srikar—achieved immense popularity and a cult following among Telugu readers from the 1970s through the 1990s. Maintaining a prolific literary career spanning several decades, he continues to contribute serialized fiction to leading Telugu publications, including the weekly magazine Swathi and the digital magazine Sahari (Online). Over the years, his serialized novels have also been prominently featured in the Telugu weekly Navya and the monthly magazine Nadhi. Beyond his print serials, he established his own publication house to independently distribute his extensive catalog of detective thrillers, socio-fantasy novels, and crime fiction, and has penned scripts for both feature films and television series.

Embracing digital media to reach a global audience, Madhu Babu launched his official audiobook and podcast venture across YouTube and major streaming platforms in May 2022 under the banner 'Shadow Madhu Babu (Official) Audio Books'. In addition, his complete catalog of novels is available to readers worldwide in digital formats on Google Play Books. He actively engages with his readership through his official WhatsApp Channel, Telegram group, and Facebook page, all of which are personally administered by him.

Prior to becoming a full-time literary figure, Madhu Babu had a distinguished career in education, serving as a headmaster in Hanuman Junction in the Krishna district of Andhra Pradesh. He currently resides with his son in Hyderabad.

== Bibliography ==
=== Shadow Novels ===
1. 2 Miles to the Border
2. A Bullet for Shadow
3. A Bullet for Shadow (Audiobook)
4. A Devil A Spy
5. A Journey to Hell
6. A Minute in Hell
7. Angel of Death
8. Assault on Shadow
9. Assignment Karachi
10. Assignment Karachi (Audiobook)
11. Assignment Love Bird
12. Baba
13. Baba (Audiobook)
14. Badmaash
15. Badmaash (Audiobook)
16. Banjay
17. Banjay (Audiobook)
18. Bhayam... Bhayam (2025)
19. Bhola Shankar 1
20. Bhola Shankar 2
21. Bhola Sankar 1 (Audiobook)
22. Bhola Sankar 2 (Audiobook)
23. Blood Hound
24. Bloody Border
25. Bombing Squad
26. Broken Revolver
27. Buffalo Hunters
28. Burma Doll
29. Caecilian Adventure
30. Carnival for Killers
31. Chichchara Pidugu (Continued by Dagger of Shadow)
32. Chichchara Pidugu (Continued by Dagger of Shadow) (Audiobook)
33. Chinese Beauty
34. Chinese Mask
35. Chinese Puzzle
36. C.I.D Shadow
37. Commander Shadow
38. Counterfeit Killer
39. Dagger of Shadow (Continuation of Chichchara Pidugu)
40. Dagger of Shadow (Continuation of Chichchara Pidugu) (Audiobook)
41. Dangerous Diabolic
42. Dangerous Game 1
43. Dangerous Game 2
44. Dangerous Game 1 (Audiobook)
45. Dangerous Game 2 (Audiobook)
46. Deadly Spy 1
47. Deadly Spy 2 - Death in the Jungle
48. Dear Shadow
49. Devil's Dinner
50. Devils in Nicobar
51. Devils in Nicobar (Audiobook)
52. Dirty Devils
53. Dr. Shadow
54. Dr. Sreekar M.B.B.S
55. Dr. Zero
56. Donga Donga Donga Pattukondi Pattukondi
57. Dual at Double Rock
58. Durmargudu
59. Dynamite Dora
60. Fighting Four
61. Fist of Shadow
62. Flying Bomb
63. Flying Falcon
64. Flying Horse
65. Golden Robe
66. Golden Shadow
67. Grenade Group
68. Gunfight in Green Land
69. Guns in the Night
70. Horrors Of Darkness
71. Hunter Shadow
72. Inspector Shadow
73. Junior Agent Sreekar
74. Kendo Warrior
75. Kill Quick or Die
76. Kill Them Mr. Shadow
77. Killers Gang
78. Kiss Kiss Kill Kill
79. Knife in the Night (Running in Swathi Weekly)
80. License to Kill
81. Lone Wolf
82. Lone Wolf (Audiobook)
83. Mera Naam Rajoola
84. Midnight Adventure 1
85. Midnight Adventure 2
86. Midnight Plus One 1
87. Midnight Plus One 2
88. Mission to Peking
89. Murdering Devils
90. Nalla Thachu (Continued by Warrior Shadow)
91. Nalla Thachu (Continued by Warrior Shadow) (Audiobook)
92. Never Love A Spy
93. Night Walker
94. Number 28
95. Once Again Shadow
96. Operation Arizona
97. Operation Bengal Tiger
98. Operation Counter Spy
99. Operation Double Cross
100. Operation Kabul
101. Professor Shadow
102. Red Shadow 1
103. Red Shadow 2
104. Revenge! Revenge!!
105. Rudraani
106. Run for the Border
107. Run for the Highlands
108. Run Shadow Run
109. Scientist Miss Madhuri
110. Scientist Shadow
111. Secret Agent Mr. Shadow
112. Seventh Killer
113. Shadow in Baghdad
114. Shadow in Borneo
115. Shadow in Borneo (Audiobook)
116. Shadow in Cochin
117. Shadow in Cochin (Audiobook)
118. Shadow in Hyderabad
119. Shadow in Japan
120. Shadow in Sikkim
121. Shadow in Thailand
122. Shadow in the Jungle
123. Shadow The Avenger
124. Shadow The Spy King
125. Shadow!
126. Shadow! Shadow!! 1
127. Shadow! Shadow!! 2
128. Shadow! Shadow!! Shadow!!!
129. Shadow Vasthunnaadu Jaagraththa
130. Silver King
131. Spider Web
132. Star Fighter (Fighting Fool) (Audiobook)
133. Target Five
134. Target Shadow (Audiobook)
135. Taste For Death
136. Temple of Death
137. Ten Against Shadow 1
138. Ten Against Shadow 2
139. Terra-205 1
140. Terra-205 2
141. The Brain Washers
142. The Curse of Kung Fu
143. The Girl From C.I.B.
144. The Killer From C.I.B.
145. Tiger Munna
146. Time for Love
147. To Shadow with Love
148. Trouble Makers
149. Viplavam Vardhillali
150. Wanted Dead or Alive
151. Warrior Shadow (Continuation of Nalla Thachu)
152. Warrior Shadow (Continuation of Nalla Thachu) (Audiobook)
153. Who are you?
154. Yamudu
155. Yamudu (Audiobook)

=== Social Novels ===
1. Aarthi
2. Aparichithudu
3. Athanu
4. Athanu (Audiobook)
5. Bairagi
6. Bhavani
7. Chakra Theerdham
8. Chakra Theerdham (Audiobook)
9. Crime Corner
10. Death Warrant
11. Down Street Mystery
12. Final Warning
13. Missing Number
14. Paamu
15. Please! Help Me!!
16. Please! Help Me!! (Audiobook)
17. Puli Madugu
18. Rahasyam
19. Red Alert
20. Red Silver
21. Rudra Bhoomi
22. Shankar Dada 1
23. Shankar Dada 2
24. Shankar Dada 1 (Audiobook)
25. Shankar Dada 2 (Audiobook)
26. Siksha 1
27. Siksha 2
28. Siksha 1 (Audiobook)
29. Siksha 2 (Audiobook)
30. Spandana
31. Terror Island
32. Vetti 1
33. Vetti 2
34. Vetti 1 (Audiobook)
35. Vetti 2 (Audiobook)

=== Fantasy Novels ===
1. Ananda Jyothi
2. Ananda Jyothi (Audiobook)
3. Bhairava (2025)
4. Chathurnethrudu 1
5. Chathurnethrudu 2
6. Chathurnethrudu 1 (Audiobook)
7. Chathurnethrudu 2 (Audiobook)
8. Gandu Cheema
9. Jaguar Jaswanth
10. Kaalakanya
11. Kaalakanya (Audiobook)
12. Kaalanaagu
13. Kaalanaagu (Audiobook)
14. Kaalikaalayam 1
15. Kaalikaalayam 2 - Kankaalaloya
16. Kaalikaalayam 3 - Kalyana Thilakam
17. Kaalikaalayam 1 (Audiobook)
18. Kaalikaalayam 2 - Kankaalaloya (Audiobook)
19. Kaalikaalayam 3 - Kalyana Thilakam (Audiobook)
20. Machchala Gurram 1
21. Machchala Gurram 2
22. Machchala Gurram 1 (Audiobook)
23. Machchala Gurram 2 (Audiobook)
24. Madhumaalini
25. Madhumaalini (Audiobook)
26. Maha Swetha (Upcoming Direct Novel)
27. Marakatha Manjusha 1
28. Marakatha Manjusha 2
29. Marakatha Manjusha 1 (Audiobook)
30. Marakatha Manjusha 2 (Audiobook)
31. Narudu
32. Narudu (Audiobook)
33. Nisaacharudu 1
34. Nisaacharudu 2
35. Rudrudu
36. Rudrudu (Audiobook)
37. Sasibaala
38. Sasibaala (Audiobook)
39. Sivangi
40. Sivangi (Audiobook)
41. Sivudu 1
42. Sivudu 2
43. Swarna Gopuram (2024)
44. Swarna Gopuram (2024) (Audiobook)
45. Swarna Khadgam 1
46. Swarna Khadgam 2
47. Vasanthothsavam 1
48. Vasanthothsavam 2
49. Vasanthothsavam 1 (Audiobook)
50. Vasanthothsavam 2 (Audiobook)
51. Veerabhadra Reddy 1
52. Veerabhadra Reddy 2
53. Vennela Madugu
54. Vennela Madugu (Audiobook)
55. Rudranagu

=== Vaatsava Shyamsunder Novels ===
1. Bomma
2. Dare Devil 1
3. Dare Devil 2
4. Finishing Touch
5. Gharshana
6. Gun Point
7. Hechcharika
8. Jwalaamukhi
9. Kankana Rahasyam
10. Nandini
11. Nissabdanaadam
12. Nissabdanaadam (audiobook)
13. Paarahushaar (2025)
14. Red Signal
15. Saadhana
16. Saalabhanjika
17. Shravani
18. Tiger Vatsava
19. Time Bomb
20. Top Secret
21. Top Ten
22. Touch Me Not
23. Two in One
24. Virgin Island
25. Viswa Prayathnam

=== Novels Translated to English ===
1. The Whispering Stone
2. The Whispering Stone (Audiobook)
3. JAGUAR JASWANTH
4. JAGUAR JASWANTH (Audiobook)
5. THE PERILOUS JOURNEY: Destiny of the Lost Heir
6. THE PERILOUS JOURNEY: Destiny of the Lost Heir (Audiobook)
7. SHIVA: The Boy The Elephants Chose! (Upcoming)
8. SHIVA: The Boy The Elephants Chose! (Upcoming - Audiobook)

=== Novels Translated to Hindi ===
1. SHIVA: Wah Baalak Jise Haathiyon ne Chuna!
2. SHIVA: Wah Baalak Jise Haathiyon ne Chuna! (Audiobook)

=== Novels Translated to Tamil ===
1. SHIVAN: Yaanaigal Therndhedutha Siruvan!

=== Novels Translated to Kannada ===
1. SHIVA: Aanegalu aarisikonda baalaka! (Upcoming)

=== TV series ===
1. Chakra Theerdham (ETV)
2. Kaalikaalayam (Gemini TV)
