= List of titles and names of Krishna =

List of titles and names of Hindu deity Krishna

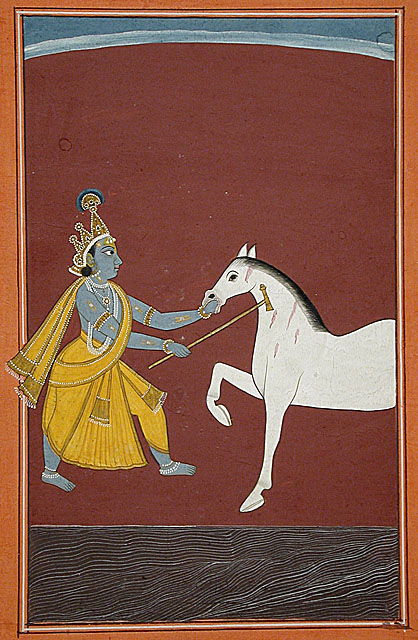
Painting of Krishna subduing Keshi, circa 1750

Krishna (/ˈkrɪʃnə/; Sanskrit: कृष्ण, IAST: Kṛṣṇa pronounced [ˈkr̩ʂ.ɳɐ] (Classical Sanskrit) and [kr̩ʂ.ɳɐ́] in (Vedic Sanskrit) is a Hindu deity worshipped across many traditions of Hinduism in a variety of different perspectives. In Hinduism, Krishna is recognized as the complete and eighth incarnation of Vishnu, or as the Supreme God (Svayam Bhagavan) in his own right.

As one of the most popular of all Hindu deities, Krishna has acquired a number of epithets, and absorbed many regionally significant deities, such as Jagannatha in Odisha and Vithoba in Maharashtra. The Hindu texts portray him in various perspectives: a lovable infant, a divine child, a prankster, a cowherd, a model lover, a divine hero, a diplomat, a king, a kingmaker, a selfless friend, a philosopher, charioteer to Arjuna and a dispenser of spiritual discourse, in the Bhagavad Gita. Among the principal scriptures that discuss Krishna's legend are the Mahabharata, the Harivamsa, the Srimad Bhagavatam, and the Vishnu Purana. The Vishnu Sahasranama, the list of Vishnu's thousand names, also includes many of the titles and names of Krishna.

== Epithets ==
In popular culture, Krishna is often associated with 108 names. The following is a list of fifty of among the most popular names, titles, and epithets associated with the deity Krishna:

Name	Transliteration	Translation
अच्युत	Acyuta	He who is infallible
माधव	Mādhava	He who is the lord of knowledge; He who is like honey
गोविन्द	Govinda	He who is a cow-protector
जनार्दन	Janārdana	He who is the original abode and protector of all living beings
केशव	Keśava	He who has long locks of hair; slayer of Keshi; He who is himself the Trimurti
हरि	Hari	He who takes away (sins)
द्वारकानाथ	Dvārakanātha	He who is the lord of Dvaraka
मुरारि	Murāri	He who is the slayer of the asura Mura
वासुदेव	Vāsudeva	He who is the son of Vasudeva
मुकुन्द	Mukunda	He who offers liberation
पार्थसारथि	Pārthasārathī	He who is the charioteer of Partha (Arjuna)
मधुसूदन	Madhusūdana	He who is the slayer of the asura Madhu
दामोदर	Dāmodara	He who has a rope around his stomach
जगन्नाथ	Jagannātha	He who is the lord of the universe
गोपाल	Gopāla	He who is a cow-protector
पुरुषोत्तम	Puruṣottama	He who is the highest being
नन्दकुमार	Nandakumāra	He who is the prince (son) of Nanda
मनोहर	Manohara	He who is lovely
जगदिश	Jagadiśa	He who is the protector of the universe
सुरेश	Sureśa	He who is the lord of the suras (devas)
श्रीकान्त	Śrīkānta	He who is beloved by Shri (Lakshmi)
श्रीनाथ	Śrīnātha	He who is the husband of Shri (Lakshmi)
परमेश्वर	Parameśvara	He who is the supreme lord
मोहन	Mohana	He who is enchanting
गिरिधर	Giridhara	He who bears mountains
सर्वजन	Sarvajana	He who is omniscient
पुण्य	Punyah	He who is supremely pure
मुरलीधर	Muralīdhara	He who bears the flute
देवकीपुत्र	Devakīputra	He who is the son of Devaki
नवनीत	Navanīta	He who eats butter
निरञ्जना	Nirañjanā	He who is unblemished
हृषीकेश	Hṛṣīkeśa	He who is the master of the senses
पतितपावन	Patitapāvana	He who is the purifier of the fallen
श्यामसुन्दर	Śyāmasundara	He who is dark and handsome
यदुनन्दन	Yadunandana	He who belongs to the Yadu dynasty
ईश्वर	Iśvara	He who is the lord (of the universe)
ज्ञानेश्‍वर	Jñāneśvara	He who is the lord of wisdom
चतुर्भुज	Caturbhuja	He who has four arms
दयानिधि	Dayānidhi	He who is the treasure of mercy
दयालु	Dayālu	He who is the repository of compassion
अनिरुद्ध	Aniruddha	He who cannot be obstructed
अक्षरा	Akṣarā	He who is indestructible
अद्भुत	Adbhutā	He who is astonishing
रुक्मिणीपति	Rukmiṇīpati	He who is the husband of Rukmini
योगेश्वर	Yogeśvara	He who is the lord of yoga
राधावल्लभ	Rādhāvallabha	He who is the beloved of Radha
पाण्डुरङ्ग	Pāṇḍuraṅga	He who is the lord of Pandharpur
ഗുരുവായൂരപ്പൻ	Guruvāyūrappan	He who is the father of Guruvayur
கண்ணன்	Kaṇṇaṉ	He who is dear
कान्हा	Kāṇha	He who is dark-skinned
पद्मनाभ	Padmanābha	one from whose navel the lotus emanates

== See also ==
- Names of God in Hinduism
- Svayam Bhagavan
- Bhagavan
