= Shyam Sundar (1940 film) =

- Directed by: A. P. Kapoor
- Produced by: N. Venugopal, B. D. Patel
- Cinematography: G. L. Molay
- Edited by: K. Sekar
- Music by: H. R. Padmanaba Sastry
- Production company: Lakshmi Cinetone
- Release date: May 18, 1940
- Running time: (13,200ft.)
- Country: India
- Language: Tamil

Shyam Sundar is a 1940 Indian, Tamil film produced by Lakshmi Cinetone and directed by A. P. Kapoor.

== Cast ==
Male

- Master Raju
- C. L. Krishnan
- S. Nath
- R. Seshan
- Thirumoorthi Achary
- Janakiram
- Kalyanasundaram
- Gopala Iyer

Female

- K. Thavamani Devi
- Kalyani Ammal
- Rukmini Devi
- K. K. Bai
- M. S. Vijayal
- Kokila Devi

== Production ==
The film was produced by Lakshmi Cinetone, Chennai at Hans Pictures Studios in Kolapur and was directed by A. P. Kapoor. N. Venugopal and B. D. Patel were in charge of production. Dialogues and lyrics were written by P. Hanumantha Rao. The film had an alternate title - Radhaiyin Kadhal.

The film was produced in Telugu with the title RadhaKrishnan.

== Soundtrack ==
The music for the lyrics was composed by H. R. Padmanaba Sastry while the background music was scored by Dada Sandekar. Lyrics were penned by P. Hanumantha Rao. Most of the songs were sung by K. Thavamani Devi set to Carnatic music tunes.
